This is a list of butterflies of the Democratic Republic of the Congo. About 2,040 species are known from the Democratic Republic of the Congo, 181 of which are endemic.
The majority of species occur in the Congolese rainforest - 
Western Congolian swamp forests, Eastern Congolian swamp forests, 
Central Congolian lowland forests, Northeastern Congolian lowland forests and it's transitions to  forest-savanna mosaic, savannas, and grasslands. Others, many rare, are found in the Albertine Rift montane forests. The miombo woodlands in the southern portion of the country are home for many species.

Papilionidae

Papilioninae

Papilionini
Papilio antimachus antimachus Drury, 1782
Papilio antimachus parva Jackson, 1956
Papilio zalmoxis Hewitson, 1864
Papilio nireus Linnaeus, 1758
Papilio charopus montuosus Joicey & Talbot, 1927
Papilio chrapkowskoides chrapkowskoides Storace, 1952
Papilio chrapkowskoides nurettini Koçak, 1983
Papilio sosia pulchra Berger, 1950
Papilio thuraui occidua Storace, 1951
Papilio cynorta Fabricius, 1793
Papilio plagiatus Aurivillius, 1898
Papilio dardanus Brown, 1776
Papilio constantinus mweruanus Joicey & Talbot, 1927
Papilio phorcas congoanus Rothschild, 1896
Papilio rex mimeticus Rothschild, 1897
Papilio zenobia Fabricius, 1775
Papilio filaprae Suffert, 1904
Papilio gallienus Distant, 1879
Papilio mechowi Dewitz, 1881
Papilio mechowianus Dewitz, 1885
Papilio echerioides homeyeri Plötz, 1880
Papilio echerioides joiceyi Gabriel, 1945
Papilio echerioides nioka (Hancock, 1989)
Papilio jacksoni hecqui Berger, 1954
Papilio jacksoni ruandana Le Cerf, 1924
Papilio nobilis crippsianus Stoneham, 1936
Papilio hesperus Westwood, 1843
Papilio lormieri lormieri Distant, 1874
Papilio lormieri semlikana Le Cerf, 1924
Papilio ophidicephalus Oberthür, 1878
Papilio leucotaenia Rothschild, 1908
Papilio mackinnoni mackinnoni Sharpe, 1891
Papilio mackinnoni theodori Riley, 1921

Leptocercini
Graphium antheus (Cramer, 1779)
Graphium policenes (Cramer, 1775)
Graphium biokoensis (Gauthier, 1984)
Graphium policenoides (Holland, 1892)
Graphium junodi (Trimen, 1893)
Graphium polistratus (Grose-Smith, 1889)
Graphium colonna (Ward, 1873)
Graphium illyris hamatus (Joicey & Talbot, 1918)
Graphium gudenusi (Rebel, 1911)
Graphium porthaon (Hewitson, 1865)
Graphium angolanus angolanus (Goeze, 1779)
Graphium angolanus baronis (Ungemach, 1932)
Graphium taboranus (Oberthür, 1886)
Graphium schaffgotschi (Niepelt, 1927)
Graphium ridleyanus (White, 1843)
Graphium leonidas (Fabricius, 1793)
Graphium tynderaeus (Fabricius, 1793)
Graphium latreillianus theorini (Aurivillius, 1881)
Graphium philonoe (Ward, 1873)
Graphium adamastor (Boisduval, 1836)
Graphium agamedes (Westwood, 1842)
Graphium schubotzi (Schultze, 1913)
Graphium olbrechtsi olbrechtsi Berger, 1950 (endemic)
Graphium olbrechtsi tongoni Berger, 1969 (endemic)
Graphium almansor almansor (Honrath, 1884)
Graphium almansor escherichi (Gaede, 1915)
Graphium almansor uganda (Lathy, 1906)
Graphium auriger (Butler, 1876)
Graphium fulleri boulleti (Le Cerf, 1912)
Graphium ucalegonides (Staudinger, 1884)
Graphium poggianus (Honrath, 1884)
Graphium hachei hachei (Dewitz, 1881)
Graphium hachei moebii (Suffert, 1904)
Graphium aurivilliusi (Seeldrayers, 1896) (endemic)
Graphium ucalegon ucalegon (Hewitson, 1865)
Graphium ucalegon fonteinei Berger, 1981
Graphium ucalegon schoutedeni Berger, 1950
Graphium simoni (Aurivillius, 1899)

Pieridae

Pseudopontiinae
Pseudopontia paradoxa (Felder & Felder, 1869)

Coliadinae
Eurema brigitta (Stoll, [1780])
Eurema mandarinula (Holland, 1892)
Eurema regularis (Butler, 1876)
Eurema floricola leonis (Butler, 1886)
Eurema hecabe solifera (Butler, 1875)
Eurema senegalensis (Boisduval, 1836)
Eurema upembana (Berger, 1981)
Catopsilia florella (Fabricius, 1775)
Colias electo hecate Strecker, 1905
Colias electo pseudohecate Berger, 1940
Colias mukana Berger, 1981

Pierinae
Colotis antevippe gavisa (Wallengren, 1857)
Colotis antevippe zera (Lucas, 1852)
Colotis aurigineus (Butler, 1883)
Colotis aurora evarne (Klug, 1829)
Colotis auxo (Lucas, 1852)
Colotis celimene sudanicus (Aurivillius, 1905)
Colotis elgonensis basilewskyi Berger, 1956
Colotis euippe euippe (Linnaeus, 1758)
Colotis euippe mediata Talbot, 1939
Colotis euippe omphale (Godart, 1819)
Colotis evenina casta (Gerstaecker, 1871)
Colotis hetaera ankolensis Stoneham, 1940
Colotis pallene (Hopffer, 1855)
Colotis protomedia (Klug, 1829)
Colotis regina (Trimen, 1863)
Colotis vesta princeps Talbot, 1939
Colotis vesta rhodesinus (Butler, 1894)
Colotis subfasciatus ducissa (Dognin, 1891)
Eronia cleodora Hübner, 1823
Eronia leda (Boisduval, 1847)
Pinacopterix eriphia wittei Berger, 1940
Nepheronia argia (Fabricius, 1775)
Nepheronia buquetii (Boisduval, 1836)
Nepheronia pharis (Boisduval, 1836)
Nepheronia thalassina verulanus (Ward, 1871)
Leptosia alcesta alcesta (Stoll, [1782])
Leptosia alcesta inalcesta Bernardi, 1959
Leptosia alcesta pseudonuptilla Bernardi, 1959
Leptosia hybrida hybrida Bernardi, 1952
Leptosia hybrida somereni Bernardi, 1959
Leptosia marginea (Mabille, 1890)
Leptosia nupta pseudonupta Bernardi, 1959
Leptosia wigginsi wigginsi (Dixey, 1915)
Leptosia wigginsi pseudalcesta Bernardi, 1965

Pierini
Appias epaphia (Cramer, [1779])
Appias perlucens (Butler, 1898)
Appias phaola intermedia Dufrane, 1948
Appias sabina (Felder & Felder, [1865])
Appias sylvia sylvia (Fabricius, 1775)
Appias sylvia nyasana (Butler, 1897)
Appias sylvia zairiensis Berger, 1981
Pontia helice johnstonii (Crowley, 1887)
Mylothris agathina agathina (Cramer, 1779)
Mylothris agathina richlora Suffert, 1904
Mylothris alberici Dufrane, 1940
Mylothris alcuana alcuana Grünberg, 1910
Mylothris alcuana binza Berger, 1981
Mylothris alcuana shaba Berger, 1981
Mylothris asphodelus Butler, 1888
Mylothris basalis Aurivillius, 1906
Mylothris bernice albescens Berger, 1981
Mylothris bernice berenicides Holland, 1896
Mylothris bernice nigrovenosa Berger, 1981
Mylothris bernice overlaeti Berger, 1981
Mylothris celisi Berger, 1981 (endemic)
Mylothris chloris (Fabricius, 1775)
Mylothris citrina holochroma Talbot, 1944
Mylothris continua continua Talbot, 1944
Mylothris continua maxima Berger, 1981
Mylothris croceus croceus Butler, 1896
Mylothris croceus ituriensis Berger, 1981
Mylothris ducarmei Hecq, 2001 (endemic)
Mylothris elodina diva Berger, 1954
Mylothris elodina pelenge Berger, 1981
Mylothris flaviana interposita Joicey & Talbot, 1921
Mylothris hilara goma Berger, 1981
Mylothris jacksoni Sharpe, 1891
Mylothris kahusiana Hecq, 2001 (endemic)
Mylothris kiwuensis kiwuensis Grünberg, 1910
Mylothris kiwuensis rhodopoides Talbot, 1944
Mylothris kiwuensis marielouisae Berger, 1979
Mylothris mafuga Berger, 1981
Mylothris nubila canescens Joicey & Talbot, 1922
Mylothris nubila fontainei Berger, 1952
Mylothris ochrea Berger, 1981 (endemic)
Mylothris polychroma Berger, 1981
Mylothris rembina (Plötz, 1880)
Mylothris rhodope (Fabricius, 1775)
Mylothris ruandana Strand, 1909
Mylothris rubricosta rubricosta (Mabille, 1890)
Mylothris rubricosta pulchra Berger, 1981
Mylothris rueppellii rhodesiana Riley, 1921
Mylothris sagala albissima Talbot, 1944
Mylothris schoutedeni Berger, 1952 (endemic)
Mylothris schumanni uniformis Talbot, 1944
Mylothris schumanni zairiensis Berger, 1981
Mylothris similis dollmani Riley, 1921
Mylothris similis noel Talbot, 1944
Mylothris sjostedti sjostedti Aurivillius, 1895
Mylothris sjostedti hecqui Berger, 1952
Mylothris subsolana Hecq, 2001
Mylothris yulei Butler, 1897
Dixeia cebron (Ward, 1871)
Dixeia dixeyi (Neave, 1904)
Dixeia doxo alberta (Grünberg, 1912)
Dixeia orbona vidua (Butler, 1900)
Dixeia pigea (Boisduval, 1836)
Belenois aurota (Fabricius, 1793)
Belenois calypso dentigera Butler, 1888
Belenois calypso marlieri Berger, 1981
Belenois calypso crawshayi Butler, 1894
Belenois creona severina (Stoll, 1781)
Belenois diminuta Butler, 1894
Belenois gidica abyssinica (Lucas, 1852)
Belenois ogygia bongeya Berger, 1981
Belenois raffrayi extendens (Joicey & Talbot, 1927)
Belenois rubrosignata (Weymer, 1901)
Belenois solilucis solilucis Butler, 1874
Belenois solilucis loveni (Aurivillius, 1921)
Belenois subeida (Felder & Felder, 1865)
Belenois sudanensis katalensis Berger, 1981
Belenois sudanensis mayumbana Berger, 1981
Belenois sudanensis pseudodentigera Berger, 1981
Belenois theora laeta (Weymer, 1903)
Belenois theora ratheo (Suffert, 1904)
Belenois theuszi (Dewitz, 1889)
Belenois thysa thysa (Hopffer, 1855)
Belenois thysa meldolae Butler, 1872
Belenois victoria hecqi Berger, 1953
Belenois victoria schoutedeni Berger, 1953
Belenois welwitschii welwitschii Rogenhofer, 1890
Belenois welwitschii shaba Berger, 1981
Belenois zochalia agrippinides (Holland, 1896)

Lycaenidae

Miletinae

Liphyrini
Euliphyra mirifica Holland, 1890
Euliphyra leucyania (Hewitson, 1874)
Aslauga aura Druce, 1913
Aslauga imitans Libert, 1994
Aslauga kallimoides Schultze, 1912
Aslauga katangana (Romieux, 1937) (endemic)
Aslauga lamborni Bethune-Baker, 1914
Aslauga marshalli Butler, 1899
Aslauga pandora Druce, 1913
Aslauga prouvosti Libert & Bouyer, 1997
Aslauga purpurascens Holland, 1890
Aslauga vininga (Hewitson, 1875)

Miletini
Megalopalpus angulosus Grünberg, 1910
Megalopalpus metaleucus Karsch, 1893
Megalopalpus simplex Röber, 1886
Megalopalpus zymna (Westwood, 1851)
Spalgis lemolea Druce, 1890
Lachnocnema bibulus (Fabricius, 1793)
Lachnocnema laches (Fabricius, 1793)
Lachnocnema pseudobibulus Libert, 1996
Lachnocnema sosia Libert, 1996
Lachnocnema durbani Trimen & Bowker, 1887
Lachnocnema intermedia Libert, 1996
Lachnocnema ducarmei Libert, 1996 (endemic)
Lachnocnema triangularis Libert, 1996
Lachnocnema emperamus (Snellen, 1872)
Lachnocnema katangae Libert, 1996 (endemic)
Lachnocnema regularis Libert, 1996
Lachnocnema obscura Libert, 1996 (endemic)
Lachnocnema overlaeti Libert, 1996 (endemic)
Lachnocnema divergens Gaede, 1915
Lachnocnema vuattouxi Libert, 1996
Lachnocnema reutlingeri reutlingeri Holland, 1892
Lachnocnema reutlingeri perspicua Libert, 1996
Lachnocnema luna Druce, 1910
Lachnocnema brunea Libert, 1996
Lachnocnema magna Aurivillius, 1895
Lachnocnema exiguus Holland, 1890
Lachnocnema disrupta Talbot, 1935

Poritiinae

Liptenini
Alaena amazoula congoana Aurivillius, 1914
Alaena maculata Hawker-Smith, 1933 (endemic)
Alaena nyassa marmorata Hawker-Smith, 1933
Alaena oberthuri Aurivillius, 1899 (endemic)
Alaena unimaculosa Hawker-Smith, 1926
Ptelina carnuta (Hewitson, 1873)
Ptelina subhyalina (Joicey & Talbot, 1921) (endemic)
Pentila maculata pardalena Druce, 1910
Pentila maculata subochracea Hawker-Smith, 1933
Pentila alba Dewitz, 1886
Pentila amenaidoides (Holland, 1893)
Pentila christina Suffert, 1904
Pentila cloetensi cloetensi Aurivillius, 1898
Pentila cloetensi catauga Rebel, 1914
Pentila cloetensi latefasciata Stempffer & Bennett, 1961
Pentila cloetensi lucayensis Schultze, 1923
Pentila glagoessa (Holland, 1893)
Pentila hewitsoni limbata (Holland, 1893)
Pentila inconspicua Druce, 1910
Pentila landbecki Stempffer & Bennett, 1961 (endemic)
Pentila pauli alberta Hulstaert, 1924
Pentila pauli elisabetha Hulstaert, 1924
Pentila pauli leopardina Schultze, 1923
Pentila pauli multiplagata Bethune-Baker, 1908
Pentila subfuscata Hawker-Smith, 1933 (endemic)
Pentila tachyroides tachyroides Dewitz, 1879
Pentila tachyroides isiro Berger, 1981
Pentila torrida (Kirby, 1887)
Pentila umangiana umangiana Aurivillius, 1898
Pentila umangiana connectens Hulstaert, 1924
Pentila umangiana fontainei Stempffer & Bennett, 1961
Pentila umangiana meridionalis Berger, 1981
Liptenara batesi Bethune-Baker, 1915
Liptenara hiendlmayri (Dewitz, 1887)
Liptenara schoutedeni (Hawker-Smith, 1926) (endemic)
Telipna acraea nigrita Talbot, 1935
Telipna sulpitia Hulstaert, 1924
Telipna albofasciata albofasciata Aurivillius, 1910
Telipna albofasciata laplumei Devos, 1917
Telipna cuypersi Libert, 2005
Telipna plagiata Joicey & Talbot, 1921 (endemic)
Telipna villiersi Stempffer, 1965
Telipna centralis Libert, 2005 (endemic)
Telipna kaputui Libert, 2005 (endemic)
Telipna acraeoides (Grose-Smith & Kirby, 1890)
Telipna hollandi hollandi Joicey & Talbot, 1921
Telipna hollandi exsuperia Hulstaert, 1924
Telipna ducarmei Libert, 2005 (endemic)
Telipna citrimaculata citrimaculata Schultze, 1916
Telipna citrimaculata neavei Bethune-Baker, 1926
Telipna sanguinea (Plötz, 1880)
Telipna consanguinea Rebel, 1914
Telipna erica Suffert, 1904
Telipna nyanza katangae Stempffer, 1961
Ornipholidotos ugandae ugandae Stempffer, 1947
Ornipholidotos ugandae goodi Libert, 2000
Ornipholidotos gabonensis Stempffer, 1947
Ornipholidotos ginettae Libert, 2005 (endemic)
Ornipholidotos abriana Libert, 2005
Ornipholidotos jolyana Libert, 2005 (endemic)
Ornipholidotos kivu Collins & Larsen, 2000 (endemic)
Ornipholidotos francisci Libert, 2005 (endemic)
Ornipholidotos katangae katangae Stempffer, 1947
Ornipholidotos katangae reducta Libert, 2005
Ornipholidotos annae Libert, 2005
Ornipholidotos amieti amieti Libert, 2005
Ornipholidotos amieti angulata Libert, 2005
Ornipholidotos overlaeti overlaeti Stempffer, 1947
Ornipholidotos overlaeti fontainei Libert, 2005
Ornipholidotos gemina gemina Libert, 2000
Ornipholidotos gemina fournierae Libert, 2005
Ornipholidotos congoensis Stempffer, 1964
Ornipholidotos oremansi Libert, 2005 (endemic)
Ornipholidotos jacksoni Stempffer, 1961
Ornipholidotos ntebi (Bethune-Baker, 1906)
Ornipholidotos nbeti Libert, 2005
Ornipholidotos ducarmei Libert, 2005 (endemic)
Ornipholidotos ghesquierei Libert, 2005 (endemic)
Ornipholidotos latimargo (Hawker-Smith, 1933)
Ornipholidotos emarginata (Hawker-Smith, 1933)
Ornipholidotos aureliae Libert, 2005 (endemic)
Ornipholidotos paradoxa centralis Libert, 2005
Ornipholidotos paradoxa orientis Libert, 2005
Ornipholidotos peucetia (Hewitson, 1866)
Torbenia stempfferi cuypersi Libert, 2005
Cooksonia trimeni trimeni Druce, 1905 (endemic)
Cooksonia trimeni terpsichore Talbot, 1935 (endemic)
Cooksonia ginettae Collins & Larsen, 2008
Mimacraea abriana Libert & Collins, 2000
Mimacraea charmian Grose-Smith & Kirby, 1889
Mimacraea darwinia Butler, 1872
Mimacraea krausei Dewitz, 1889
Mimacraea landbecki Druce, 1910
Mimacraea marshalli Trimen, 1898
Mimacraea neurata Holland, 1895
Mimacraea fulvaria Aurivillius, 1895
Mimacraea eltringhami Druce, 1912
Mimacraea paragora paragora Rebel, 1911
Mimacraea paragora angulata Libert, 2000
Mimacraea skoptoles Druce, 1907
Mimacraea telloides Schultze, 1923
Mimeresia debora debora (Kirby, 1890)
Mimeresia debora barnsi (Hawker-Smith, 1933)
Mimeresia debora deborula (Aurivillius, 1899)
Mimeresia dinora discirubra (Talbot, 1937)
Mimeresia drucei drucei (Stempffer, 1954)
Mimeresia drucei ugandae (Stempffer, 1954)
Mimeresia favillacea griseata (Talbot, 1937)
Mimeresia moreelsi moreelsi (Aurivillius, 1901)
Mimeresia moreelsi purpurea (Hawker-Smith, 1933)
Mimeresia neavei (Joicey & Talbot, 1921)
Mimeresia russulus russulus (Druce, 1910)
Mimeresia russulus katangae (Hawker-Smith, 1926)
Liptena albomacula Hawker-Smith, 1933
Liptena amabilis Schultze, 1923
Liptena bergeri Stempffer, Bennett & May, 1974 (endemic)
Liptena congoana Hawker-Smith, 1933
Liptena decipiens etoumbi Stempffer, Bennett & May, 1974
Liptena decipiens leucostola (Holland, 1890)
Liptena despecta (Holland, 1890)
Liptena eukrines Druce, 1905
Liptena fatima (Kirby, 1890)
Liptena flavicans aequatorialis Stempffer, 1956
Liptena flavicans praeusta Schultze, 1917
Liptena fontainei Stempffer, Bennett & May, 1974 (endemic)
Liptena fulvicans Hawker-Smith, 1933 (endemic)
Liptena homeyeri Dewitz, 1884
Liptena lualaba Berger, 1981
Liptena modesta (Kirby, 1890)
Liptena mwagensis Dufrane, 1953 (endemic)
Liptena nigromarginata Stempffer, 1961
Liptena opaca gabunica Stempffer, Bennett & May, 1974
Liptena opaca sankuru Stempffer, Bennett & May, 1974
Liptena orubrum tripunctata (Grose-Smith & Kirby, 1894)
Liptena overlaeti Stempffer, Bennett & May, 1974 (endemic)
Liptena praestans congoensis Schultze, 1923
Liptena rubromacula Hawker-Smith, 1933
Liptena subsuffusa Hawker-Smith, 1933 (endemic)
Liptena turbata (Kirby, 1890)
Liptena undularis Hewitson, 1866
Liptena xanthostola xanthostola (Holland, 1890)
Liptena xanthostola xantha (Grose-Smith, 1901)
Obania subvariegata aliquantum (Druce, 1910)
Obania tulliana (Grose-Smith, 1901) (endemic)
Kakumia ideoides (Dewitz, 1887)
Tetrarhanis ilala etoumbi (Stempffer, 1964)
Tetrarhanis ilma ilma (Hewitson, 1873)
Tetrarhanis ilma lathyi (Joicey & Talbot, 1921)
Tetrarhanis rougeoti (Stempffer, 1954)
Tetrarhanis schoutedeni (Berger, 1954)
Tetrarhanis stempfferi (Berger, 1954)
Falcuna dorotheae Stempffer & Bennett, 1963
Falcuna hollandi hollandi (Aurivillius, 1899)
Falcuna hollandi nigricans Stempffer & Bennett, 1963
Falcuna iturina Stempffer & Bennett, 1963
Falcuna kasai Stempffer & Bennett, 1963 (endemic)
Falcuna margarita (Suffert, 1904)
Falcuna orientalis bwamba Stempffer & Bennett, 1963
Falcuna overlaeti Stempffer & Bennett, 1963 (endemic)
Falcuna semliki Stempffer & Bennett, 1963 (endemic)
Falcuna synesia (Hulstaert, 1924)
Larinopoda lagyra lagyra (Hewitson, 1866)
Larinopoda lagyra reducta Berger, 1981
Larinopoda lircaea (Hewitson, 1866)
Larinopoda tera (Hewitson, 1873)
Micropentila adelgitha (Hewitson, 1874)
Micropentila adelgunda (Staudinger, 1892)
Micropentila brunnea centralis Bennett, 1966
Micropentila bunyoro Stempffer & Bennett, 1965
Micropentila dorothea Bethune-Baker, 1903
Micropentila fontainei Stempffer & Bennett, 1965
Micropentila katangana Stempffer & Bennett, 1965 (endemic)
Micropentila sankuru Stempffer & Bennett, 1965 (endemic)
Micropentila ugandae Hawker-Smith, 1933
Micropentila victoriae Stempffer & Bennett, 1965
Pseuderesia eleaza eleaza (Hewitson, 1873)
Pseuderesia eleaza katera Stempffer, 1961
Pseuderesia mapongua (Holland, 1893)
Eresina bergeri Stempffer, 1956
Eresina bilinea Talbot, 1935
Eresina fontainei Stempffer, 1956
Eresina katangana Stempffer, 1956
Eresina rougeoti Stempffer, 1956
Eresina toroensis Joicey & Talbot, 1921
Eresiomera campbelli Collins & Larsen, 1998
Eresiomera isca (Hewitson, 1873)
Eresiomera magnimacula (Rebel, 1914)
Eresiomera nancy Collins & Larsen, 1998
Eresiomera phaeochiton (Grünberg, 1910)
Citrinophila erastus erastus (Hewitson, 1866)
Citrinophila erastus pallida Hawker-Smith, 1933
Citrinophila tenera (Kirby, 1887)
Citrinophila terias Joicey & Talbot, 1921
Citrinophila unipunctata Bethune-Baker, 1908
Argyrocheila inundifera Hawker-Smith, 1933
Argyrocheila undifera Staudinger, 1892
Argyrocheila ugandae Hawker-Smith, 1933
Baliochila barnesi Stempffer & Bennett, 1953
Baliochila neavei Stempffer & Bennett, 1953
Baliochila hildegarda (Kirby, 1887)
Cnodontes vansomereni Stempffer & Bennett, 1953
Cnodontes bouyeri Kielland, 1994 (endemic)

Epitolini
Toxochitona gerda (Kirby, 1890)
Toxochitona sankuru Stempffer, 1961
Iridana euprepes (Druce, 1905) (endemic)
Iridana hypocala Eltringham, 1929
Iridana incredibilis (Staudinger, 1891)
Iridana marina Talbot, 1935
Iridana rougeoti Stempffer, 1964
Teratoneura congoensis Stempffer, 1954
Epitola urania Kirby, 1887
Epitola uranioides uranoides Libert, 1999
Cerautola adolphifriderici (Schultze, 1911)
Cerautola ceraunia (Hewitson, 1873)
Cerautola crowleyi holochroma (Berger, 1981)
Cerautola crowleyi leucographa Libert, 1999
Cerautola miranda vidua (Talbot, 1935)
Cerautola semibrunnea (Bethune-Baker, 1916)
Cerautola decellei (Stempffer, 1956) (endemic)
Cerautola hewitsonioides (Hawker-Smith, 1933)
Geritola cyanea (Jackson, 1964)
Geritola dubia (Jackson, 1964)
Geritola gerina (Hewitson, 1878)
Geritola goodii (Holland, 1890)
Geritola liana (Roche, 1954)
Geritola subargentea (Jackson, 1964)
Stempfferia carcassoni Jackson, 1962
Stempfferia annae Libert, 1999
Stempfferia badura badura (Kirby, 1890)
Stempfferia badura contrasta Libert, 1999
Stempfferia cercene (Hewitson, 1873)
Stempfferia cercenoides (Holland, 1890)
Stempfferia ciconia mongiro (Jackson, 1968)
Stempfferia cinerea (Berger, 1981)
Stempfferia coerulea (Jackson, 1962)
Stempfferia congoana (Aurivillius, 1923)
Stempfferia flavoantennata (Roche, 1954)
Stempfferia ginettae ginettae Libert, 1999
Stempfferia ginettae meridionalis Libert, 1999
Stempfferia gordoni (Druce, 1903)
Stempfferia insulana (Aurivillius, 1923)
Stempfferia iturina (Joicey & Talbot, 1921)
Stempfferia magnifica (Jackson, 1964)
Stempfferia marginata (Kirby, 1887)
Stempfferia michelae centralis Libert, 1999
Stempfferia suzannae (Berger, 1981) (endemic)
Stempfferia sylviae Libert, 1999
Stempfferia tumentia (Druce, 1910)
Stempfferia uniformis (Kirby, 1887)
Stempfferia zelza (Hewitson, 1873)
Cephetola aureliae Libert, 1999 (endemic)
Cephetola barnsi Libert, 1999 (endemic)
Cephetola catuna (Kirby, 1890)
Cephetola cephena cephena (Hewitson, 1873)
Cephetola cephena entebbeana (Bethune-Baker, 1926)
Cephetola ducarmei Libert, 1999 (endemic)
Cephetola eliasis angustata Libert & Collins, 1999
Cephetola eliasis epitolina Libert & Collins, 1999
Cephetola ghesquierei (Roche, 1954)
Cephetola kakamegae Libert & Collins, 1999
Cephetola katerae (Jackson, 1962)
Cephetola kiellandi (Libert & Congdon, 1998)
Cephetola maculata (Hawker-Smith, 1926)
Cephetola nigra (Bethune-Baker, 1903)
Cephetola orientalis (Roche, 1954)
Cephetola overlaeti Libert, 1999 (endemic)
Cephetola pinodes budduana (Talbot, 1937)
Cephetola subgriseata (Jackson, 1964)
Cephetola sublustris (Bethune-Baker, 1904)
Cephetola vinalli (Talbot, 1935)
Cephetola viridana (Joicey & Talbot, 1921)
Deloneura subfusca Hawker-Smith, 1933
Neaveia lamborni orientalis Jackson, 1962
Epitolina dispar (Kirby, 1887)
Epitolina melissa (Druce, 1888)
Epitolina catori ugandae Jackson, 1962
Hypophytala henleyi (Kirby, 1890)
Hypophytala hyetta (Hewitson, 1873)
Hypophytala reducta (Aurivillius, 1923)
Hypophytala vansomereni (Jackson, 1964)
Phytala elais ugandae Jackson, 1964
Neoepitola barombiensis (Kirby, 1890)
Aethiopana honorius (Fabricius, 1793)
Hewitsonia congoensis Joicey & Talbot, 1921
Hewitsonia inexpectata Bouyer, 1997
Hewitsonia intermedia Jackson, 1962
Hewitsonia kirbyi kirbyi Dewitz, 1879
Hewitsonia kirbyi preussi Staudinger, 1891
Hewitsonia magdalenae Stempffer, 1951 (endemic)
Hewitsonia ugandae Jackson, 1962
Powellana cottoni Bethune-Baker, 1908

Aphnaeinae
Pseudaletis agrippina Druce, 1888
Pseudaletis camarensis depuncta Libert, 2007
Pseudaletis michelae Libert, 2007
Pseudaletis clymenus (Druce, 1885)
Pseudaletis lusambo Stempffer, 1961
Pseudaletis zebra Holland, 1891
Pseudaletis rileyi Libert, 2007
Pseudaletis taeniata Libert, 2007
Pseudaletis ducarmei Libert, 2007 (endemic)
Pseudaletis busoga van Someren, 1939
Pseudaletis antimachus (Staudinger, 1888)
Pseudaletis mazanguli Neave, 1910
Pseudaletis batesi zairensis Libert, 2007
Lipaphnaeus aderna pan (Talbot, 1935)
Lipaphnaeus eustorgia (Hulstaert, 1924)
Lipaphnaeus leonina bitje (Druce, 1910)
Lipaphnaeus leonina loxura (Rebel, 1914)
Chloroselas overlaeti Stempffer, 1956
Cigaritis apelles (Oberthür, 1878)
Cigaritis apuleia (Hulstaert, 1924)
Cigaritis bergeri (Bouyer, 2003) (endemic)
Cigaritis brunnea (Jackson, 1966)
Cigaritis crustaria (Holland, 1890)
Cigaritis cynica (Riley, 1921)
Cigaritis dufranei (Bouyer, 1991)
Cigaritis ella (Hewitson, 1865)
Cigaritis hassoni (Bouyer, 2003) (endemic)
Cigaritis homeyeri (Dewitz, 1887)
Cigaritis modestus heathi (d'Abrera, 1980)
Cigaritis montana (Joicey & Talbot, 1924) (endemic)
Cigaritis nairobiensis (Sharpe, 1904)
Cigaritis overlaeti (Bouyer, 1998)
Cigaritis pinheyi (Heath, 1983)
Cigaritis shaba (Bouyer, 1991) (endemic)
Cigaritis trimeni congolanus (Dufrane, 1954)
Zeritis fontainei Stempffer, 1956
Zeritis sorhagenii (Dewitz, 1879)
Axiocerses harpax efulena Clench, 1963
Axiocerses harpax ugandana Clench, 1963
Axiocerses tjoane rubescens Henning & Henning, 1996
Axiocerses bambana orichalcea Henning & Henning, 1996
Axiocerses amanga (Westwood, 1881)
Erikssonia cooksoni Druce, 1905 (endemic)
Aphnaeus adamsi Stempffer, 1954
Aphnaeus affinis Riley, 1921
Aphnaeus argyrocyclus Holland, 1890
Aphnaeus asterius Plötz, 1880
Aphnaeus chapini (Holland, 1920)
Aphnaeus charboneli Bouyer & Libert, 1996
Aphnaeus erikssoni Trimen, 1891
Aphnaeus herbuloti Stempffer, 1971
Aphnaeus marshalli Neave, 1910
Aphnaeus orcas (Drury, 1782)
Aphnaeus questiauxi Aurivillius, 1903

Theclinae
Myrina sharpei sharpei Bethune-Baker, 1906
Myrina sharpei fontainei Stempffer, 1961
Myrina silenus (Fabricius, 1775)
Oxylides albata (Aurivillius, 1895)
Oxylides bella Aurivillius, 1899 (endemic)
Oxylides binza Berger, 1981 (endemic)
Oxylides feminina (Sharpe, 1904)
Oxylides stempfferi Berger, 1981 (endemic)
Oxylides gloveri Hawker-Smith, 1929
Syrmoptera homeyerii (Dewitz, 1879)
Syrmoptera melanomitra melanomitra Karsch, 1895
Syrmoptera melanomitra nivea Joicey & Talbot, 1924
Syrmoptera mixtura (Hulstaert, 1924) (endemic)
Dapidodigma demeter nuptus Clench, 1961
Hypolycaena antifaunus antifaunus (Westwood, 1851)
Hypolycaena antifaunus latimacula (Joicey & Talbot, 1921)
Hypolycaena auricostalis (Butler, 1897)
Hypolycaena buxtoni spurcus Talbot, 1929
Hypolycaena dubia Aurivillius, 1895
Hypolycaena hatita hatita Hewitson, 1865
Hypolycaena hatita japhusa Riley, 1921
Hypolycaena hatita ugandae Sharpe, 1904
Hypolycaena jacksoni Bethune-Baker, 1906
Hypolycaena lebona lebona (Hewitson, 1865)
Hypolycaena lebona davenporti Larsen, 1997
Hypolycaena liara liara Druce, 1890
Hypolycaena liara plana Talbot, 1935
Hypolycaena naara Hewitson, 1873
Hypolycaena nigra Bethune-Baker, 1914
Hypolycaena pachalica Butler, 1888
Hypolycaena schubotzi Aurivillius, 1923 (endemic)
Hypolycaena similis Dufrane, 1945 (endemic)
Hemiolaus caeculus (Hopffer, 1855)
Leptomyrina makala Bethune-Baker, 1908
Iolaus bilineata Bethune-Baker, 1908 (endemic)
Iolaus bolissus Hewitson, 1873
Iolaus agnes Aurivillius, 1898
Iolaus aurivillii Röber, 1900
Iolaus bakeri (Riley, 1928)
Iolaus bellina exquisita (Riley, 1928)
Iolaus coelestis Bethune-Baker, 1926
Iolaus creta Hewitson, 1878
Iolaus cytaeis cytaeis Hewitson, 1875
Iolaus cytaeis caerulea (Riley, 1928)
Iolaus farquharsoni (Bethune-Baker, 1922)
Iolaus fontainei (Stempffer, 1956)
Iolaus frater (Joicey & Talbot, 1921)
Iolaus hemicyanus barnsi (Joicey & Talbot, 1921)
Iolaus iasis Hewitson, 1865
Iolaus maesa (Hewitson, 1862)
Iolaus mafugae (Stempffer & Bennett, 1959)
Iolaus neavei (Druce, 1910)
Iolaus pollux pollux Aurivillius, 1895
Iolaus pollux albocaerulea (Riley, 1929)
Iolaus sappirus (Druce, 1902)
Iolaus sibella (Druce, 1910)
Iolaus sidus Trimen, 1864
Iolaus silanus silenus (Hawker-Smith, 1928)
Iolaus stenogrammica (Riley, 1928)
Iolaus violacea (Riley, 1928)
Iolaus pallene (Wallengren, 1857)
Iolaus trimeni Wallengren, 1875
Iolaus iulus Hewitson, 1869
Iolaus jamesoni (Druce, 1891)
Iolaus shaba Collins & Larsen, 1995 (endemic)
Iolaus parasilanus parasilanus Rebel, 1914
Iolaus parasilanus divaricatus (Riley, 1928)
Iolaus parasilanus mabillei (Riley, 1928)
Iolaus ismenias (Klug, 1834)
Iolaus alcibiades Kirby, 1871
Iolaus paneperata Druce, 1890
Iolaus poecilaon (Riley, 1928)
Iolaus aequatorialis (Stempffer & Bennett, 1958)
Iolaus bergeri (Stempffer, 1953) (endemic)
Iolaus caesareus Aurivillius, 1895
Iolaus crawshayi littoralis (Stempffer & Bennett, 1958)
Iolaus iturensis (Joicey & Talbot, 1921)
Iolaus ndolae (Stempffer & Bennett, 1958)
Iolaus silarus Druce, 1885
Iolaus timon timon (Fabricius, 1787)
Iolaus timon congoensis (Joicey & Talbot, 1921)
Iolaus catori Bethune-Baker, 1904
Iolaus kyabobo Larsen, 1996
Stugeta bowkeri maria Suffert, 1904
Pilodeudorix mimeta mimeta (Karsch, 1895)
Pilodeudorix mimeta angusta Libert, 2004
Pilodeudorix ula (Karsch, 1895)
Pilodeudorix virgata (Druce, 1891)
Pilodeudorix anetia (Hulstaert, 1924)
Pilodeudorix angelita (Suffert, 1904)
Pilodeudorix aruma simplex (Schultze, 1917)
Pilodeudorix bemba (Neave, 1910)
Pilodeudorix canescens (Joicey & Talbot, 1921)
Pilodeudorix elealodes (Bethune-Baker, 1908) (endemic)
Pilodeudorix kafuensis (Neave, 1910)
Pilodeudorix leonina indentata Libert, 2004
Pilodeudorix mera mera (Hewitson, 1873
Pilodeudorix mera kinumbensis (Dufrane, 1945)
Pilodeudorix otraeda genuba (Hewitson, 1875)
Pilodeudorix tenuivittata (Stempffer, 1951) (endemic)
Pilodeudorix camerona camerona (Plötz, 1880)
Pilodeudorix camerona katanga (Clench, 1965)
Pilodeudorix congoana congoana (Aurivillius, 1923)
Pilodeudorix congoana orientalis (Stempffer, 1957)
Pilodeudorix kohli (Aurivillius, 1921)
Pilodeudorix zela (Hewitson, 1869)
Pilodeudorix zelomina (Rebel, 1914)
Pilodeudorix hugoi Libert, 2004
Pilodeudorix catalla (Karsch, 1895)
Pilodeudorix corruscans (Aurivillius, 1898)
Pilodeudorix deritas (Hewitson, 1874)
Pilodeudorix ducarmei (Collins & Larsen, 1998) (endemic)
Pilodeudorix fumata (Stempffer, 1954)
Pilodeudorix kiellandi (Congdon & Collins, 1998)
Pilodeudorix pasteon (Druce, 1910)
Pilodeudorix pseudoderitas (Stempffer, 1964)
Pilodeudorix violetta (Aurivillius, 1897)
Paradeudorix cobaltina (Stempffer, 1964)
Paradeudorix eleala (Hewitson, 1865)
Paradeudorix ituri (Bethune-Baker, 1908)
Paradeudorix marginata (Stempffer, 1962)
Paradeudorix moyambina (Bethune-Baker, 1904)
Paradeudorix petersi (Stempffer & Bennett, 1956)
Hypomyrina nomenia extensa Libert, 2004
Hypomyrina mimetica Libert, 2004
Hypomyrina fournierae Gabriel, 1939
Deudorix badhami Carcasson, 1961
Deudorix batikelides Holland, 1920 (endemic)
Deudorix dinochares Grose-Smith, 1887
Deudorix dinomenes diomedes Jackson, 1966
Deudorix diocles Hewitson, 1869
Deudorix edwardsi Gabriel, 1939
Deudorix kayonza Stempffer, 1956
Deudorix lorisona lorisona (Hewitson, 1862)
Deudorix lorisona baronica Ungemach, 1932
Deudorix nicephora Hulstaert, 1924
Deudorix odana Druce, 1887
Capys catharus Riley, 1932

Lycaeninae

Lycaena phlaeas ethiopica (Poulton, 1922)

Polyommatinae

Lycaenesthini
Anthene afra (Bethune-Baker, 1910)
Anthene alberta (Bethune-Baker, 1910)
Anthene bakeri (Druce, 1910) (endemic)
Anthene bipuncta (Joicey & Talbot, 1921)
Anthene contrastata mashuna (Stevenson, 1937)
Anthene crawshayi (Butler, 1899)
Anthene definita (Butler, 1899)
Anthene discimacula (Joicey & Talbot, 1921) (endemic)
Anthene hobleyi kigezi Stempffer, 1961
Anthene indefinita (Bethune-Baker, 1910)
Anthene irumu (Stempffer, 1948)
Anthene ituria (Bethune-Baker, 1910)
Anthene kampala (Bethune-Baker, 1910)
Anthene katera Talbot, 1937
Anthene lachares lachares (Hewitson, 1878)
Anthene lachares toroensis Stempffer, 1947
Anthene larydas (Cramer, 1780)
Anthene leptines (Hewitson, 1874)
Anthene ligures (Hewitson, 1874)
Anthene liodes (Hewitson, 1874)
Anthene locuples (Grose-Smith, 1898)
Anthene lunulata (Trimen, 1894)
Anthene lysicles (Hewitson, 1874)
Anthene mahota (Grose-Smith, 1887)
Anthene makala (Bethune-Baker, 1910)
Anthene nigropunctata (Bethune-Baker, 1910)
Anthene onias (Hulstaert, 1924) (endemic)
Anthene otacilia (Trimen, 1868)
Anthene pyroptera (Aurivillius, 1895)
Anthene ramnika d'Abrera, 1980
Anthene rubricinctus rubricinctus (Holland, 1891)
Anthene rubricinctus anadema (Druce, 1905)
Anthene rubricinctus jeanneli Stempffer, 1961
Anthene rufomarginata (Bethune-Baker, 1910) (endemic)
Anthene ruwenzoricus (Grünberg, 1911) (endemic)
Anthene schoutedeni (Hulstaert, 1924)
Anthene scintillula (Holland, 1891)
Anthene starki Larsen, 2005
Anthene sylvanus sylvanus (Drury, 1773)
Anthene sylvanus niveus Stempffer, 1954
Anthene versatilis (Bethune-Baker, 1910)
Anthene xanthopoecilus (Holland, 1893)
Anthene zenkeri (Karsch, 1895)
Anthene lamprocles (Hewitson, 1878)
Anthene aequatorialis Stempffer, 1962 (endemic)
Anthene chryseostictus (Bethune-Baker, 1910)
Anthene likouala Stempffer, 1962
Anthene lusones (Hewitson, 1874)
Anthene staudingeri (Grose-Smith & Kirby, 1894)
Anthene fasciatus (Aurivillius, 1895)
Anthene hades (Bethune-Baker, 1910)
Anthene inconspicua (Druce, 1910)
Anthene kamilila (Bethune-Baker, 1910)
Anthene lacides (Hewitson, 1874)
Anthene lamias lamias (Hewitson, 1878)
Anthene lamias katerae (d'Abrera, 1980)
Anthene lucretilis albipicta (Talbot, 1935)
Anthene lutzi (Holland, 1920) (endemic)
Anthene nigeriae (Aurivillius, 1905)
Anthene obscura (Druce, 1910)
Anthene rufoplagata (Bethune-Baker, 1910)
Cupidesthes albida (Aurivillius, 1923) (endemic)
Cupidesthes arescopa arescopa Bethune-Baker, 1910
Cupidesthes arescopa orientalis (Stempffer, 1962)
Cupidesthes cuprifascia Joicey & Talbot, 1921
Cupidesthes leonina (Bethune-Baker, 1903)
Cupidesthes lithas (Druce, 1890)
Cupidesthes minor Joicey & Talbot, 1921 (endemic)
Cupidesthes thyrsis (Kirby, 1878)
Cupidesthes ysobelae Jackson, 1966

Polyommatini
Cupidopsis cissus extensa Libert, 2003
Cupidopsis jobates (Hopffer, 1855)
Pseudonacaduba aethiops (Mabille, 1877)
Uranothauma antinorii felthami (Stevenson, 1934)
Uranothauma cordatus (Sharpe, 1892)
Uranothauma delatorum Heron, 1909
Uranothauma falkensteini (Dewitz, 1879)
Uranothauma heritsia heritsia (Hewitson, 1876)
Uranothauma heritsia intermedia (Tite, 1958)
Uranothauma heritsia virgo (Butler, 1896)
Uranothauma lunifer (Rebel, 1914)
Uranothauma nubifer (Trimen, 1895)
Uranothauma poggei (Dewitz, 1879)
Uranothauma vansomereni Stempffer, 1951
Phlyaria cyara cyara (Hewitson, 1876)
Phlyaria cyara tenuimarginata (Grünberg, 1908)
Cacyreus audeoudi Stempffer, 1936
Cacyreus tespis (Herbst, 1804)
Cacyreus virilis Stempffer, 1936
Harpendyreus aequatorialis vulcanica (Joicey & Talbot, 1924)
Harpendyreus argenteostriata Stempffer, 1961
Harpendyreus kisaba (Joicey & Talbot, 1921)
Harpendyreus major (Joicey & Talbot, 1924)
Harpendyreus marlieri Stempffer, 1961 (endemic)
Harpendyreus marungensis (Joicey & Talbot, 1924)
Harpendyreus reginaldi Heron, 1909
Leptotes cassioides (Capronnier, 1889) (endemic)
Leptotes marginalis (Stempffer, 1944)
Leptotes pulchra (Murray, 1874)
Tuxentius calice (Hopffer, 1855)
Tuxentius carana (Hewitson, 1876)
Tuxentius margaritaceus (Sharpe, 1892)
Tuxentius melaena (Trimen & Bowker, 1887)
Tarucus sybaris linearis (Aurivillius, 1924)
Zintha hintza (Trimen, 1864)
Zizina antanossa (Mabille, 1877)
Actizera stellata (Trimen, 1883)
Azanus isis (Drury, 1773)
Eicochrysops eicotrochilus Bethune-Baker, 1924
Eicochrysops fontainei Stempffer, 1961 (endemic)
Euchrysops albistriata (Capronnier, 1889)
Euchrysops barkeri (Trimen, 1893)
Euchrysops crawshayi fontainei Stempffer, 1967
Euchrysops katangae Bethune-Baker, 1923
Euchrysops mauensis Bethune-Baker, 1923
Euchrysops reducta Hulstaert, 1924
Euchrysops severini Hulstaert, 1924
Euchrysops subpallida Bethune-Baker, 1923
Euchrysops unigemmata (Butler, 1895)
Thermoniphas alberici (Dufrane, 1945)
Thermoniphas distincta (Talbot, 1935)
Thermoniphas fontainei Stempffer, 1956
Thermoniphas fumosa Stempffer, 1952
Thermoniphas plurilimbata plurilimbata Karsch, 1895
Thermoniphas plurilimbata rutshurensis (Joicey & Talbot, 1921)
Thermoniphas togara (Plötz, 1880)
Thermoniphas kamitugensis (Dufrane, 1945) (endemic)
Oboronia albicosta (Gaede, 1916)
Oboronia guessfeldti (Dewitz, 1879)
Oboronia ornata vestalis (Aurivillius, 1895)
Oboronia pseudopunctatus (Strand, 1912)
Oboronia punctatus (Dewitz, 1879)
Lepidochrysops anerius (Hulstaert, 1924)
Lepidochrysops chloauges (Bethune-Baker, [1923])
Lepidochrysops cinerea (Bethune-Baker, [1923])
Lepidochrysops cupreus (Neave, 1910)
Lepidochrysops glauca (Trimen & Bowker, 1887)
Lepidochrysops loveni loveni (Aurivillius, 1922)
Lepidochrysops loveni kivuensis (Joicey & Talbot, 1921)
Lepidochrysops pampolis (Druce, 1905)
Lepidochrysops plebeia proclus (Hulstaert, 1924)
Lepidochrysops polydialecta (Bethune-Baker, [1923])
Lepidochrysops skotios (Druce, 1905)
Lepidochrysops solwezii (Bethune-Baker, [1923])
Lepidochrysops stormsi (Robbe, 1892)
Lepidochrysops victoriae occidentalis Libert & Collins, 2001

Riodinidae

Nemeobiinae
Abisara tantalus caerulea Carpenter & Jackson, 1950
Abisara tantalus cyanis Callaghan, 2003
Abisara intermedia Aurivillius, 1895
Abisara caeca caeca Rebel, 1914
Abisara caeca semicaeca Riley, 1932
Abisara rutherfordii cyclops Riley, 1932
Abisara gerontes gabunica Riley, 1932
Abisara dewitzi Aurivillius, 1898
Abisara rogersi rogersi Druce, 1878
Abisara rogersi simulacris Riley, 1932
Abisara neavei neavei Riley, 1932
Abisara neavei dollmani Riley, 1932
Abisara neavei kivuensis Riley, 1932

Nymphalidae

Libytheinae
Libythea labdaca Westwood, 1851

Danainae

Danaini
Danaus chrysippus (Linnaeus, 1758)
Tirumala formosa mercedonia (Karsch, 1894)
Tirumala petiverana (Doubleday, 1847)
Amauris niavius (Linnaeus, 1758)
Amauris albimaculata magnimacula Rebel, 1914
Amauris crawshayi oscarus Thurau, 1904
Amauris crawshayi simulator Talbot, 1926
Amauris dannfelti restricta Talbot, 1940
Amauris echeria katangae Neave, 1910
Amauris echeria mpala Talbot, 1940
Amauris echeria terrena Talbot, 1940
Amauris ellioti Butler, 1895
Amauris hecate (Butler, 1866)
Amauris hyalites Butler, 1874
Amauris inferna inferna Butler, 1871
Amauris inferna discus Talbot, 1940
Amauris inferna grogani Sharpe, 1901
Amauris vashti (Butler, 1869)

Satyrinae

Elymniini
Elymniopsis bammakoo bammakoo (Westwood, [1851])
Elymniopsis bammakoo rattrayi (Sharpe, 1902)

Melanitini
Gnophodes betsimena parmeno Doubleday, 1849
Gnophodes chelys (Fabricius, 1793)
Gnophodes grogani Sharpe, 1901
Melanitis ansorgei Rothschild, 1904
Melanitis libya Distant, 1882
Aphysoneura pigmentaria dewittei Bouyer, 2001
Aphysoneura pigmentaria semilatilimba Kielland, 1989
Aphysoneura scapulifascia scapulifascia Joicey & Talbot, 1922
Aphysoneura scapulifascia zairensis Kielland, 1989

Satyrini
Bicyclus albocincta (Rebel, 1914) (endemic)
Bicyclus alboplaga (Rebel, 1914)
Bicyclus analis (Aurivillius, 1895)
Bicyclus angulosa angulosa (Butler, 1868)
Bicyclus angulosa selousi (Trimen, 1895)
Bicyclus anynana centralis Condamin, 1968
Bicyclus auricruda fulgidus Fox, 1963
Bicyclus aurivillii (Butler, 1896)
Bicyclus buea (Strand, 1912)
Bicyclus campina (Aurivillius, 1901)
Bicyclus campus (Karsch, 1893)
Bicyclus cooksoni (Druce, 1905)
Bicyclus cottrelli (van Son, 1952)
Bicyclus dentata (Sharpe, 1898)
Bicyclus dorothea (Cramer, 1779)
Bicyclus dubia (Aurivillius, 1893)
Bicyclus ena (Hewitson, 1877)
Bicyclus ephorus bergeri Condamin, 1965
Bicyclus evadne elionias (Hewitson, 1866)
Bicyclus golo (Aurivillius, 1893)
Bicyclus graueri (Rebel, 1914)
Bicyclus hewitsoni (Doumet, 1861)
Bicyclus hyperanthus (Bethune-Baker, 1908)
Bicyclus iccius (Hewitson, 1865)
Bicyclus ignobilis eurini Condamin & Fox, 1963
Bicyclus istaris (Plötz, 1880)
Bicyclus italus (Hewitson, 1865)
Bicyclus jefferyi Fox, 1963
Bicyclus lamani (Aurivillius, 1900)
Bicyclus madetes carola d'Abrera, 1980
Bicyclus mandanes Hewitson, 1873
Bicyclus matuta matuta (Karsch, 1894)
Bicyclus matuta idjwiensis Condamin, 1965
Bicyclus medontias (Hewitson, 1873)
Bicyclus mesogena (Karsch, 1894)
Bicyclus milyas (Hewitson, 1864)
Bicyclus mollitia (Karsch, 1895)
Bicyclus moyses Condamin & Fox, 1964
Bicyclus nachtetis Condamin, 1965
Bicyclus neustetteri (Rebel, 1914)
Bicyclus persimilis (Joicey & Talbot, 1921)
Bicyclus procora (Karsch, 1893)
Bicyclus rhacotis (Hewitson, 1866)
Bicyclus sambulos (Hewitson, 1877)
Bicyclus martius sanaos (Hewitson, 1866)
Bicyclus sandace (Hewitson, 1877)
Bicyclus saussurei saussurei (Dewitz, 1879)
Bicyclus saussurei angustus Condamin, 1970
Bicyclus sciathis (Hewitson, 1866)
Bicyclus sebetus (Hewitson, 1877)
Bicyclus smithi smithi (Aurivillius, 1899)
Bicyclus smithi eurypterus Condamin, 1965
Bicyclus sophrosyne sophrosyne (Plötz, 1880)
Bicyclus sophrosyne overlaeti Condamin, 1965
Bicyclus suffusa suffusa (Riley, 1921)
Bicyclus suffusa ituriensis Condamin, 1970
Bicyclus sweadneri Fox, 1963
Bicyclus taenias (Hewitson, 1877)
Bicyclus technatis (Hewitson, 1877)
Bicyclus trilophus trilophus (Rebel, 1914)
Bicyclus trilophus jacksoni Condamin, 1961
Bicyclus vansoni Condamin, 1965
Bicyclus vulgaris (Butler, 1868)
Bicyclus xeneas (Hewitson, 1866)
Bicyclus xeneoides Condamin, 1961
Hallelesis asochis congoensis (Joicey & Talbot, 1921)
Heteropsis centralis (Aurivillius, 1903)
Heteropsis eliasis (Hewitson, 1866)
Heteropsis perspicua (Trimen, 1873)
Heteropsis phaea phaea (Karsch, 1894)
Heteropsis phaea ignota (Libert, 2006)
Heteropsis simonsii (Butler, 1877)
Heteropsis teratia (Karsch, 1894)
Heteropsis ubenica ugandica (Kielland, 1994)
Heteropsis peitho (Plötz, 1880)
Heteropsis nigrescens (Bethune-Baker, 1908)
Ypthima albida albida Butler, 1888
Ypthima albida uniformis Bartel, 1905
Ypthima condamini Kielland, 1982
Ypthima congoana Overlaet, 1955
Ypthima diplommata Overlaet, 1954
Ypthima doleta Kirby, 1880
Ypthima granulosa Butler, 1883
Ypthima impura Elwes & Edwards, 1893
Ypthima praestans Overlaet, 1954
Ypthima pulchra Overlaet, 1954
Ypthima pupillaris pupillaris Butler, 1888
Ypthima pupillaris obscurata Kielland, 1982
Ypthima recta Overlaet, 1955
Ypthima rhodesiana Carcasson, 1961
Mashuna upemba (Overlaet, 1955)
Neocoenyra cooksoni Druce, 1907
Neocoenyra duplex Butler, 1886
Neocoenyra fulleborni Thurau, 1903
Neocoenyra kivuensis Seydel, 1929
Neocoenyra ypthimoides Butler, 1894
Physcaeneura pione Godman, 1880

Charaxinae

Charaxini
Charaxes fulvescens fulvescens (Aurivillius, 1891)
Charaxes fulvescens monitor Rothschild, 1900
Charaxes acuminatus cottrelli van Someren, 1963
Charaxes acuminatus kigezia van Someren, 1963
Charaxes acuminatus thiryi Bouyer & Vingerhoedt, 2001
Charaxes protoclea catenaria Rousseau-Decelle, 1934
Charaxes protoclea nothodes Jordan, 1911
Charaxes protoclea protonothodes van Someren, 1971
Charaxes boueti Feisthamel, 1850
Charaxes macclounii Butler, 1895
Charaxes alticola Grünberg, 1911
Charaxes cynthia kinduana Le Cerf, 1923
Charaxes cynthia sabulosus Talbot, 1928
Charaxes lucretius intermedius van Someren, 1971
Charaxes lucretius maximus van Someren, 1971
Charaxes lactetinctus Karsch, 1892
Charaxes jasius brunnescens Poulton, 1926
Charaxes epijasius Reiche, 1850
Charaxes jasius saturnus Butler, 1866
Charaxes castor (Cramer, 1775)
Charaxes brutus angustus Rothschild, 1900
Charaxes ansorgei ruandana Talbot, 1932
Charaxes pollux (Cramer, 1775)
Charaxes druceanus obscura Rebel, 1914
Charaxes druceanus proximans Joicey & Talbot, 1922
Charaxes eudoxus mechowi Rothschild, 1900
Charaxes richelmanni richelmanni Röber, 1936
Charaxes richelmanni ducarmei Plantrou, 1982
Charaxes numenes aequatorialis van Someren, 1972
Charaxes tiridates tiridatinus Röber, 1936
Charaxes bipunctatus ugandensis van Someren, 1972
Charaxes mixtus Rothschild, 1894
Charaxes murphyi Collins, 1989
Charaxes overlaeti Schouteden, 1934
Charaxes bohemani Felder & Felder, 1859
Charaxes smaragdalis smaragdalis Butler, 1866
Charaxes smaragdalis allardi Bouyer & Vingerhoedt, 1997
Charaxes smaragdalis caerulea Jackson, 1951
Charaxes smaragdalis leopoldi Ghesquiére, 1933
Charaxes xiphares bergeri Plantrou, 1975
Charaxes xiphares burgessi van Son, 1953
Charaxes xiphares upembana Plantrou, 1976
Charaxes imperialis albipuncta Joicey & Talbot, 1920
Charaxes imperialis pauliani Rousseau-Decelle, 1933
Charaxes imperialis ugandicus van Someren, 1972
Charaxes ameliae ameliae Doumet, 1861
Charaxes ameliae amelina Joicey & Talbot, 1925
Charaxes pythodoris Hewitson, 1873
Charaxes hadrianus Ward, 1871
Charaxes lecerfi Lathy, 192
Charaxes nobilis nobilis Druce, 1873
Charaxes nobilis rosaemariae Rousseau-Decelle, 1934
Charaxes acraeoides Druce, 1908
Charaxes fournierae Le Moult, 1930
Charaxes zingha (Stoll, 1780)
Charaxes etesipe etesipe (Godart, 1824)
Charaxes etesipe shaba Berger, 1981
Charaxes penricei penricei Rothschild, 1900
Charaxes penricei dealbata van Someren, 1966
Charaxes achaemenes achaemenes Felder & Felder, 1867
Charaxes achaemenes monticola van Someren, 1970
Charaxes jahlusa argynnides Westwood, 1864
Charaxes eupale latimargo Joicey & Talbot, 1921
Charaxes subornatus subornatus Schultze, 1916
Charaxes subornatus minor Joicey & Talbot, 1921
Charaxes dilutus Rothschild, 1898
Charaxes montis Jackson, 1956
Charaxes anticlea adusta Rothschild, 1900
Charaxes anticlea mwera Vingerhoedt & Bouyer, 1996
Charaxes anticlea proadusta van Someren, 1971
Charaxes baumanni bwamba van Someren, 1971
Charaxes baumanni whytei Butler, 1894
Charaxes opinatus Heron, 1909
Charaxes thysi Capronnier, 1889
Charaxes taverniersi Berger, 1975
Charaxes hildebrandti hildebrandti (Dewitz, 1879)
Charaxes hildebrandti katangensis Talbot, 1928
Charaxes virilis van Someren & Jackson, 1952
Charaxes catachrous van Someren & Jackson, 1952
Charaxes etheocles carpenteri van Someren & Jackson, 1957
Charaxes ethalion kitungulensis Strand, 1911
Charaxes ethalion nyanzae van Someren, 1967
Charaxes cedreatis Hewitson, 1874
Charaxes subrubidus van Someren, 1972
Charaxes howarthi Mining, 1976
Charaxes fulgurata Aurivillius, 1899
Charaxes diversiforma van Someren & Jackson, 1957
Charaxes viola picta van Someren & Jackson, 1952
Charaxes guderiana (Dewitz, 1879)
Charaxes kheili Staudinger, 1896
Charaxes pleione bebra Rothschild, 1900
Charaxes pleione congoensis Plantrou, 1989
Charaxes paphianus paphianus Ward, 1871
Charaxes paphianus subpallida Joicey & Talbot, 1925
Charaxes kahldeni Homeyer & Dewitz, 1882
Charaxes zoolina mafugensis Jackson, 1956
Charaxes nichetes nichetes Grose-Smith, 1883
Charaxes nichetes leoninus Butler, 1895
Charaxes nichetes pantherinus Rousseau-Decelle, 1934
Charaxes lycurgus bernardiana Plantrou, 1978
Charaxes zelica rougeoti Plantrou, 1978
Charaxes porthos porthos Grose-Smith, 1883
Charaxes porthos katangae Rousseau-Decelle, 1931
Charaxes doubledayi Aurivillius, 1899
Charaxes mycerina nausicaa Staudinger, 1891
Charaxes gerdae Rydon, 1989
Charaxes matakall Darge, 1985
Charaxes schiltzei Bouyer, 1991
Charaxes virescens Bouyer, 1991 (endemic)

Euxanthini
Charaxes eurinome ansellica (Butler, 1870)
Charaxes crossleyi crossleyi (Ward, 1871)
Charaxes crossleyi claudiae (Rousseau-Decelle, 1934)
Charaxes crossleyi magnifica (Rebel, 1914)
Charaxes trajanus trajanus (Ward, 1871)
Charaxes trajanus antonius (Rousseau-Decelle, 1938)
Charaxes trajanus vansomereni (Poulton, 1929)

Pallini
Palla publius centralis van Someren, 1975
Palla ussheri dobelli (Hall, 1919)
Palla decius (Cramer, 1777)
Palla violinitens coniger (Butler, 1896)
Palla violinitens bwamba van Someren, 1975

Apaturinae
Apaturopsis cleochares (Hewitson, 1873)

Nymphalinae
Kallimoides rumia jadyae (Fox, 1968)
Vanessula milca latifasciata Joicey & Talbot, 1928

Nymphalini
Antanartia delius (Drury, 1782)
Antanartia schaeneia dubia Howarth, 1966
Vanessa dimorphica (Howarth, 1966)
Vanessa abyssinica vansomereni Howarth, 1966
Junonia artaxia Hewitson, 1864
Junonia chorimene (Guérin-Méneville, 1844)
Junonia natalica angolensis (Rothschild, 1918)
Junonia schmiedeli (Fiedler, 1920)
Junonia sophia infracta Butler, 1888
Junonia stygia (Aurivillius, 1894)
Junonia gregorii Butler, 1896
Junonia terea terea (Drury, 1773)
Junonia terea elgiva Hewitson, 1864
Junonia terea tereoides (Butler, 1901)
Junonia touhilimasa Vuillot, 1892
Junonia westermanni Westwood, 1870
Junonia ansorgei (Rothschild, 1899)
Junonia cymodoce lugens (Schultze, 1912)
Salamis cacta (Fabricius, 1793)
Protogoniomorpha anacardii ansorgei (Rothschild, 1904)
Protogoniomorpha anacardii nebulosa (Trimen, 1881)
Protogoniomorpha parhassus (Drury, 1782)
Protogoniomorpha temora (Felder & Felder, 1867)
Precis actia Distant, 1880
Precis archesia (Cramer, 1779)
Precis ceryne (Boisduval, 1847)
Precis coelestina Dewitz, 1879
Precis cuama (Hewitson, 1864)
Precis milonia milonia Felder & Felder, 1867
Precis milonia wintgensi Strand, 1909
Precis octavia octavia (Cramer, 1777)
Precis octavia sesamus Trimen, 1883
Precis pelarga (Fabricius, 1775)
Precis rauana rauana (Grose-Smith, 1898)
Precis rauana silvicola Schultz, 1916
Precis sinuata sinuata Plötz, 1880
Precis sinuata hecqui Berger, 1981
Precis tugela pyriformis (Butler, 1896)
Hypolimnas anthedon anthedon (Doubleday, 1845)
Hypolimnas anthedon wahlbergi (Wallengren, 1857)
Hypolimnas bartelotti Grose-Smith, 1890
Hypolimnas dinarcha (Hewitson, 1865)
Hypolimnas mechowi (Dewitz, 1884)
Hypolimnas misippus (Linnaeus, 1764)
Hypolimnas monteironis (Druce, 1874)
Hypolimnas salmacis (Drury, 1773)
Mallika jacksoni (Sharpe, 1896)

Cyrestinae

Cyrestini
Cyrestis camillus (Fabricius, 1781)

Biblidinae

Biblidini
Byblia anvatara crameri Aurivillius, 1894
Mesoxantha ethosea ethoseoides Rebel, 1914
Ariadne actisanes (Hewitson, 1875)
Ariadne albifascia (Joicey & Talbot, 1921)
Ariadne enotrea archeri Carcasson, 1958
Ariadne enotrea suffusa (Joicey & Talbot, 1921)
Ariadne pagenstecheri (Suffert, 1904)
Ariadne personata (Joicey & Talbot, 1921)
Neptidopsis ophione nucleata Grünberg, 1911
Eurytela alinda Mabille, 1893
Eurytela dryope dryope (Cramer, [1775])
Eurytela dryope angulata Aurivillius, 1899
Eurytela hiarbas (Drury, 1782)

Epicaliini
Sevenia amulia amulia (Cramer, 1777)
Sevenia amulia intermedia (Carcasson, 1961)
Sevenia amulia benguelae (Chapman, 1872)
Sevenia boisduvali omissa (Rothschild, 1918)
Sevenia consors (Rothschild & Jordan, 1903)
Sevenia dubiosa (Strand, 1911)
Sevenia garega (Karsch, 1892)
Sevenia morantii (Trimen, 1881)
Sevenia occidentalium (Mabille, 1876)
Sevenia pechueli (Dewitz, 1879)
Sevenia trimeni major (Rothschild, 1918)
Sevenia umbrina (Karsch, 1892)

Limenitinae

Limenitidini
Harma theobene superna (Fox, 1968)
Cymothoe altisidora (Hewitson, 1869)
Cymothoe angulifascia Aurivillius, 1897 (endemic)
Cymothoe anitorgis (Hewitson, 1874)
Cymothoe aramis schoutedeni Overlaet, 1952
Cymothoe arcuata Overlaet, 1945
Cymothoe beckeri beckeri (Herrich-Schaeffer, 1858)
Cymothoe beckeri theodosia Staudinger, 1890
Cymothoe caenis (Drury, 1773)
Cymothoe capella (Ward, 1871)
Cymothoe caprina Aurivillius, 1897
Cymothoe coccinata coccinata (Hewitson, 1874)
Cymothoe coccinata vrydaghi Overlaet, 1944
Cymothoe collarti Overlaet, 1942
Cymothoe colmanti Aurivillius, 1898
Cymothoe cyclades (Ward, 1871)
Cymothoe distincta distincta Overlaet, 1944
Cymothoe distincta kivuensis Overlaet, 1952
Cymothoe confusa Aurivillius, 1887
Cymothoe eris eris Aurivillius, 1896
Cymothoe eris capellides Holland, 1920
Cymothoe eris sankuruana Overlaet, 1952
Cymothoe excelsa deltoides Overlaet, 1944
Cymothoe excelsa regisleopoldi Overlaet, 1944
Cymothoe fontainei Overlaet, 1952
Cymothoe fumana balluca Fox & Howarth, 1968
Cymothoe harmilla micans Bouyer & Joly, 1995
Cymothoe haynae diphyia Karsch, 1894
Cymothoe haynae fumosa Staudinger, 1896
Cymothoe haynae vosiana Overlaet, 1942
Cymothoe heliada liberatorum Overlaet, 1952
Cymothoe heliada mutshindji Overlaet, 1940
Cymothoe herminia katshokwe Overlaet, 1940
Cymothoe hesiodotus hesiodotus Staudinger, 1890
Cymothoe hesiodotus clarior Overlaet, 1952
Cymothoe hobarti candidata Overlaet, 1954
Cymothoe hobarti mwamikazi Overlaet, 1952
Cymothoe howarthi Rydon, 1981 (endemic)
Cymothoe hyarbita hyarbitina Aurivillius, 1897
Cymothoe hypatha (Hewitson, 1866)
Cymothoe indamora (Hewitson, 1866)
Cymothoe isiro Rydon, 1981 (endemic)
Cymothoe jodutta ciceronis (Ward, 1871)
Cymothoe jodutta ehmckei Dewitz, 1887
Cymothoe jodutta mostinckxi Overlaet, 1952
Cymothoe lucasii lucasii (Doumet, 1859)
Cymothoe lucasii cloetensi Seeldrayers, 1896
Cymothoe lurida hesione Weymer, 1907
Cymothoe lurida centralis Overlaet, 1952
Cymothoe lurida tristis Overlaet, 1952
Cymothoe magnus Joicey & Talbot, 1928 (endemic)
Cymothoe meridionalis meridionalis Overlaet, 1944 (endemic)
Cymothoe meridionalis ghesquierei Overlaet, 1944 (endemic)
Cymothoe ochreata Grose-Smith, 1890
Cymothoe oemilius (Doumet, 1859)
Cymothoe ogova (Plötz, 1880)
Cymothoe orphnina orphnina Karsch, 1894
Cymothoe orphnina suavis Schultze, 1913
Cymothoe reginaeelisabethae reginaeelisabethae Holland, 1920
Cymothoe reginaeelisabethae belgarum Overlaet, 1952
Cymothoe reinholdi vitalis Rebel, 1914
Cymothoe sangaris sangaris (Godart, 1824)
Cymothoe sangaris luluana Overlaet, 1945
Cymothoe sassiana sassiana Schouteden, 1912 (endemic)
Cymothoe sassiana intermedia Neustetter, 1912 (endemic)
Cymothoe weymeri Suffert, 1904
Cymothoe zenkeri Richelmann, 1913
Kumothales inexpectata Overlaet, 1940
Pseudoneptis bugandensis ianthe Hemming, 1964
Pseudacraea acholica mayenceae Hecq, 1987
Pseudacraea boisduvalii (Doubleday, 1845)
Pseudacraea clarkii Butler & Rothschild, 1892
Pseudacraea deludens ducarmei Hecq, 1990
Pseudacraea dolomena dolomena (Hewitson, 1865)
Pseudacraea dolomena congoensis Jackson, 1951
Pseudacraea rubrobasalis Aurivillius, 1903
Pseudacraea eurytus (Linnaeus, 1758)
Pseudacraea kuenowii kuenowii Dewitz, 1879
Pseudacraea kuenowii gottbergi Dewitz, 1884
Pseudacraea lucretia protracta (Butler, 1874)
Pseudacraea poggei (Dewitz, 1879)
Pseudacraea semire (Cramer, 1779)
Pseudacraea warburgi Aurivillius, 1892

Neptidini
Neptis agouale agouale Pierre-Baltus, 1978
Neptis agouale parallela Collins & Larsen, 1996
Neptis alta Overlaet, 1955
Neptis camarensis Schultze, 1920
Neptis carpenteri d'Abrera, 1980
Neptis conspicua Neave, 1904
Neptis constantiae kaumba Condamin, 1966
Neptis angusta Condamin, 1966
Neptis continuata Holland, 1892
Neptis exaleuca exaleuca Karsch, 1894
Neptis exaleuca suffusa Rothschild, 1918
Neptis gratiosa Overlaet, 1955
Neptis jamesoni Godman & Salvin, 1890
Neptis jordani Neave, 1910
Neptis kiriakoffi Overlaet, 1955
Neptis laeta Overlaet, 1955
Neptis lermanni Aurivillius, 1896
Neptis liberti Pierre & Pierre-Baltus, 1998
Neptis lugubris Rebel, 1914
Neptis marci Collins & Larsen, 1998
Neptis melicerta (Drury, 1773)
Neptis metanira Holland, 1892
Neptis metella (Doubleday, 1848)
Neptis mixophyes Holland, 1892
Neptis morosa Overlaet, 1955
Neptis nebrodes Hewitson, 1874
Neptis nemetes nemetes Hewitson, 1868
Neptis nemetes margueriteae Fox, 1968
Neptis nicobule Holland, 1892
Neptis nicomedes Hewitson, 1874
Neptis quintilla Mabille, 1890
Neptis nicoteles Hewitson, 1874
Neptis occidentalis Rothschild, 1918
Neptis ochracea ochracea Neave, 1904
Neptis ochracea lualabae Berger, 1981
Neptis ochracea ochreata Gaede, 1915
Neptis poultoni Eltringham, 1921
Neptis puella Aurivillius, 1894
Neptis rothschildi Eltringham, 1921 (endemic)
Neptis seeldrayersi Aurivillius, 1895
Neptis serena Overlaet, 1955
Neptis strigata strigata Aurivillius, 1894
Neptis strigata kakamega Collins & Larsen, 1996
Neptis trigonophora melicertula Strand, 1912
Neptis troundi Pierre-Baltus, 1978
Neptis vingerhoedti Pierre-Baltus, 2003 (endemic)

Adoliadini
Catuna angustatum (Felder & Felder, 1867)
Catuna crithea (Drury, 1773)
Catuna niji Fox, 1965
Catuna oberthueri Karsch, 1894
Euryphura achlys (Hopffer, 1855)
Euryphura athymoides Berger, 1981
Euryphura chalcis (Felder & Felder, 1860)
Euryphura isuka Stoneham, 1935
Euryphura ducarmei Hecq, 1990
Euryphura plautilla (Hewitson, 1865)
Euryphura porphyrion congoensis Joicey & Talbot, 1921
Euryphura porphyrion fontainei Hecq, 1990
Euryphura concordia (Hopffer, 1855)
Euryphurana nobilis viridis (Hancock, 1990)
Harmilla elegans elegans Aurivillius, 1892
Harmilla elegans hawkeri Joicey & Talbot, 1926
Pseudargynnis hegemone (Godart, 1819)
Aterica galene extensa Heron, 1909
Cynandra opis bernardii Lagnel, 1967
Euriphene hecqui Collins & Larsen, 1997
Euriphene abasa (Hewitson, 1866)
Euriphene adumbrata (Joicey & Talbot, 1928) (endemic)
Euriphene alberici (Dufrane, 1945) (endemic)
Euriphene amaranta (Karsch, 1894)
Euriphene amicia (Hewitson, 1871)
Euriphene atossa atossa (Hewitson, 1865)
Euriphene atossa australis d'Abrera, 1980
Euriphene atrovirens (Mabille, 1878)
Euriphene barombina (Aurivillius, 1894)
Euriphene butleri butleri (Aurivillius, 1904)
Euriphene butleri kivuensis (Jackson & Howarth, 1957)
Euriphene camarensis (Ward, 1871)
Euriphene conjungens chalybeata (Talbot, 1937)
Euriphene core Hecq, 1994 (endemic)
Euriphene ernestibaumanni integribasis (Hulstaert, 1924)
Euriphene excelsior (Rebel, 1911)
Euriphene fouassini Hecq, 1994 (endemic)
Euriphene gambiae gabonica Bernardi, 1966
Euriphene glaucopis (Gaede, 1916)
Euriphene goniogramma (Karsch, 1894)
Euriphene grosesmithi (Staudinger, 1891)
Euriphene incerta incerta (Aurivillius, 1912)
Euriphene incerta theodota (Hulstaert, 1924)
Euriphene intermixta (Aurivillius, 1904) (endemic)
Euriphene iris (Aurivillius, 1903)
Euriphene ituriensis (Jackson & Howarth, 1957) (endemic)
Euriphene jacksoni (Talbot, 1937)
Euriphene jolyana Hecq, 1987 (endemic)
Euriphene kahli (Holland, 1920) (endemic)
Euriphene karschi (Aurivillius, 1894)
Euriphene luteostriata (Bethune-Baker, 1908)
Euriphene mawamba Bethune-Baker, 1908 (endemic)
Euriphene milnei (Hewitson, 1865)
Euriphene monforti Hecq, 1994 (endemic)
Euriphene niepelti Neustetter, 1916
Euriphene obsoleta (Grünberg, 1908)
Euriphene pallidior (Hulstaert, 1924)
Euriphene plagiata (Aurivillius, 1897)
Euriphene rectangula (Schultze, 1920)
Euriphene regula Hecq, 1994
Euriphene ribensis (Ward, 1871)
Euriphene romi (Aurivillius, 1898) (endemic)
Euriphene rotundata (Holland, 1920) (endemic)
Euriphene saphirina saphirina (Karsch, 1894)
Euriphene saphirina trioculata (Talbot, 1927)
Euriphene tadema tadema (Hewitson, 1866)
Euriphene tadema nigropunctata (Aurivillius, 1901)
Euriphene doriclea (Drury, 1782)
Euriphene lysandra (Stoll, 1790)
Euriphene melanops (Aurivillius, 1897)
Bebearia languida (Schultze, 1920)
Bebearia tentyris seeldrayersi (Aurivillius, 1899)
Bebearia carshena (Hewitson, 1871)
Bebearia absolon (Fabricius, 1793)
Bebearia micans (Aurivillius, 1899)
Bebearia zonara (Butler, 1871)
Bebearia mandinga mandinga (Felder & Felder, 1860)
Bebearia mandinga beni Hecq, 1990
Bebearia oxione squalida (Talbot, 1928)
Bebearia abesa abesa (Hewitson, 1869)
Bebearia abesa pandera Hecq, 1988
Bebearia partita (Aurivillius, 1895)
Bebearia barce maculata (Aurivillius, 1912)
Bebearia comus comus (Ward, 1871)
Bebearia comus retracta Hecq, 1989
Bebearia cocalioides Hecq, 1988
Bebearia guineensis (Felder & Felder, 1867)
Bebearia cocalia badiana (Rbel, 1914)
Bebearia cocalia katera (van Someren, 1939)
Bebearia sophus sophus (Fabricius, 1793)
Bebearia sophus aruunda (Overlaet, 1955)
Bebearia staudingeri (Aurivillius, 1893)
Bebearia plistonax (Hewitson, 1874)
Bebearia elpinice (Hewitson, 1869)
Bebearia brunhilda brunhilda (Kirby, 1889)
Bebearia brunhilda iturina (Karsch, 1894)
Bebearia brunhilda sankuruensis Hecq, 1989
Bebearia congolensis (Capronnier, 1889)
Bebearia laetitioides (Joicey & Talbot, 1921)
Bebearia severini (Aurivillius, 1897)
Bebearia phranza fuscara Hecq, 1989
Bebearia phranza moreelsi d'Abrera, 1980
Bebearia phranza robiginosus (Talbot, 1927)
Bebearia laetitia laetitia (Plötz, 1880)
Bebearia laetitia vesta Hecq, 1989
Bebearia flaminia (Staudinger, 1891)
Bebearia maximiana (Staudinger, 1891)
Bebearia nivaria tenuimacula Berger, 1981
Bebearia phantasia concolor Hecq, 1988
Bebearia leptotypa (Bethune-Baker, 1908) (endemic)
Bebearia equatorialis Hecq, 1989 (endemic)
Bebearia tessmanni kwiluensis Hecq, 1989
Bebearia cutteri cuypersi Hecq, 2002
Bebearia eliensis eliensis (Hewitson, 1866)
Bebearia eliensis unita (Capronnier, 1889)
Bebearia barombina (Staudinger, 1896)
Bebearia octogramma (Grose-Smith & Kirby, 1889)
Bebearia allardi Hecq, 1989 (endemic)
Bebearia aurora aurora (Aurivillius, 1896)
Bebearia aurora graueri Hecq, 1990
Bebearia aurora theia Hecq, 1989
Bebearia aurora wilverthi (Aurivillius, 1898)
Bebearia braytoni (Sharpe, 1907)
Bebearia chilonis (Hewitson, 1874)
Bebearia chloeropis (Bethune-Baker, 1908)
Bebearia cinaethon cinaethon (Hewitson, 1874)
Bebearia cinaethon ikelemboides Hecq, 1989
Bebearia cottoni (Bethune-Baker, 1908) (endemic)
Bebearia defluera Hecq, 1998
Bebearia discors Hecq, 1994
Bebearia ducalis (Grünberg, 1911) (endemic)
Bebearia ducarmei Hecq, 1987
Bebearia fontaineana Hecq, 1987
Bebearia fontainei Berger, 1981 (endemic)
Bebearia fulgurata (Aurivillius, 1904) (endemic)
Bebearia hargreavesi d'Abrera, 1980 (endemic)
Bebearia ikelemba (Aurivillius, 1901) (endemic)
Bebearia hassoni kamituga Berger, 1981
Bebearia luteola (Bethune-Baker, 1908) (endemic)
Bebearia makala (Bethune-Baker, 1908)
Bebearia picturata Hecq, 1989 (endemic)
Bebearia romboutsi Hecq, 2001 (endemic)
Bebearia schoutedeni (Overlaet, 1954)
Euphaedra rubrocostata rubrocostata (Aurivillius, 1897)
Euphaedra rubrocostata generosa Hecq, 1987
Euphaedra symphona symphona Bethune-Baker, 1908 (endemic)
Euphaedra symphona affabilis Hecq, 1996 (endemic)
Euphaedra aurivillii Niepelt, 1914 (endemic)
Euphaedra adolfifriderici Schultze, 1920
Euphaedra luteofasciata Hecq, 1979
Euphaedra marginalis Hecq, 1979 (endemic)
Euphaedra lupercoides Rothschild, 1918
Euphaedra imperialis arta Hecq, 1979
Euphaedra medon innotata Holland, 1920
Euphaedra medon celestis Hecq, 1986
Euphaedra medon neustetteri Niepelt, 1915
Euphaedra clio Hecq, 1981
Euphaedra ducarmei Hecq, 1977 (endemic)
Euphaedra landbecki Rothschild, 1918 (endemic)
Euphaedra thalie Hecq, 1981 (endemic)
Euphaedra erici Hecq & Joly, 1987 (endemic)
Euphaedra zaddachii zaddachii Dewitz, 1879
Euphaedra zaddachii crawshayi Butler, 1895
Euphaedra zaddachii elephantina Staudinger, 1891
Euphaedra mbamou Hecq, 1987
Euphaedra morini Hecq, 1983 (endemic)
Euphaedra barnsi Joicey & Talbot, 1922
Euphaedra jacqueshecqui Bollino, 1998 (endemic)
Euphaedra hewitsoni bipuncta Hecq, 1974
Euphaedra hewitsoni angusta Hecq, 1974
Euphaedra acuta Hecq, 1977
Euphaedra oremansi Hecq, 1996 (endemic)
Euphaedra maxima Holland, 1920
Euphaedra brevis Hecq, 1977
Euphaedra herberti herberti (Sharpe, 1891)
Euphaedra herberti katanga Hecq, 1980
Euphaedra graueri Rothschild, 1918 (endemic)
Euphaedra ubangi Hecq, 1974 (endemic)
Euphaedra acutoides Hecq, 1996 (endemic)
Euphaedra karschi karschi Bartel, 1905
Euphaedra karschi sankuruensis Hecq, 1980
Euphaedra lata Hecq, 1980
Euphaedra grandis Hecq, 1980 (endemic)
Euphaedra sinuosa sinuosa Hecq, 1974 (endemic)
Euphaedra sinuosa plagiaria Hecq, 1980 (endemic)
Euphaedra sinuosa smitsi Hecq, 1991 (endemic)
Euphaedra hollandi Hecq, 1974
Euphaedra diffusa Gaede, 1916
Euphaedra mirabilis mirabilis Hecq, 1980
Euphaedra mirabilis lurida Hecq, 1997
Euphaedra mirabilis nubila Hecq, 1986
Euphaedra ansorgei Rothschild, 1918
Euphaedra caerulescens Grose-Smith, 1890
Euphaedra cuprea cuprea Hecq, 1980 (endemic)
Euphaedra cuprea irangi Oremans, 2000 (endemic)
Euphaedra cuprea smaragdula Hecq, 2004 (endemic)
Euphaedra irangi Hecq, 2004 (endemic)
Euphaedra romboutsi Hecq, 2004 (endemic)
Euphaedra imitans Holland, 1893
Euphaedra cyparissa aurata Carpenter, 1895
Euphaedra sarcoptera cyparissoides Hecq, 1979
Euphaedra sarcoptera nipponicorum (Carcasson, 1965)
Euphaedra thierrybaulini Oremans, 1999 (endemic)
Euphaedra permixtum (Butler, 1873)
Euphaedra eberti eberti Aurivillius, 1896
Euphaedra eberti hamus Berger, 1940
Euphaedra janetta campaspoides Hecq, 1985
Euphaedra janetta remota Hecq, 1991
Euphaedra campaspe permixtoides Hecq, 1986
Euphaedra centralis Hecq, 1985 (endemic)
Euphaedra congo Hecq, 1985
Euphaedra justicia Staudinger, 1886
Euphaedra apparata Hecq, 1982 (endemic)
Euphaedra adonina spectacularis Hecq, 1997
Euphaedra piriformis Hecq, 1982
Euphaedra uniformis Berger, 1981
Euphaedra ueleana Hecq, 1982 (endemic)
Euphaedra sarita sarita (Sharpe, 1891)
Euphaedra sarita lulua Hecq, 1977
Euphaedra grilloti Hecq, 1983
Euphaedra fontainei Hecq, 1977
Euphaedra intermedia Rebel, 1914 (endemic)
Euphaedra phosphor Joicey & Talbot, 1921
Euphaedra viridicaerulea inanoides Holland, 1920
Euphaedra viridicaerulea griseargentina Hecq, 1977
Euphaedra ravola (Hewitson, 1866)
Euphaedra preussiana preussiana Gaede, 1916
Euphaedra preussiana robusta Hecq, 1983
Euphaedra solida Hecq, 1997 (endemic)
Euphaedra cottoni Sharpe, 1907
Euphaedra jolyana Hecq, 1986 (endemic)
Euphaedra regisleopoldi Hecq, 1996 (endemic)
Euphaedra regularis Hecq, 1983 (endemic)
Euphaedra dargeana Hecq, 1980
Euphaedra subprotea Hecq, 1986
Euphaedra preussi preussi Staudinger, 1891
Euphaedra preussi pallida Hecq, 1984
Euphaedra alboides Hecq, 1984 (endemic)
Euphaedra vicina vicina Hecq, 1984
Euphaedra vicina pallidoides Hecq, 1984
Euphaedra procera Hecq, 1984
Euphaedra subprocera Hecq, 1984 (endemic)
Euphaedra albofasciata Berger, 1981
Euphaedra disjuncta disjuncta Hecq, 1984
Euphaedra disjuncta virens Hecq, 1984
Euphaedra mayumbensis Hecq, 1984
Euphaedra subviridis Holland, 1920 (endemic)
Euphaedra fulvofasciata Hecq, 1984
Euphaedra leloupi Overlaet, 1955 (endemic)
Euphaedra margueriteae Hecq, 1978
Euphaedra overlaeti Hulstaert, 1926
Euphaedra fascinata Hecq, 1984
Euphaedra xerophila Hecq, 1974 (endemic)
Euphaedra ochrovirens Hecq, 1984
Euphaedra miranda Hecq, 1984
Euphaedra niveovittata Overlaet, 1955 (endemic)
Euphaedra illustris Talbot, 1927 (endemic)
Euphaedra bergeri Hecq, 1974 (endemic)
Euphaedra cinnamomea Rothschild, 1918 (endemic)
Euphaedra eleus eleus (Drury, 1782)
Euphaedra eleus gigas Hecq, 1996
Euphaedra simplex Hecq, 1978
Euphaedra alacris Hecq, 1978
Euphaedra alternus van Someren, 1935 (endemic)
Euphaedra rattrayi Sharpe, 1904
Euphaedra subferruginea Guillaumin, 1976
Euphaedra coprates (Druce, 1875)
Euphaedra ochracea Hecq, 1980 (endemic)
Euphaedra variabilis Guillaumin, 1976
Euphaedra cooksoni Druce, 1905
Euphaedra katangensis Talbot, 1927
Euphaedra nigrobasalis nigrobasalis Joicey & Talbot, 1921
Euphaedra nigrobasalis upemba Overlaet, 1955
Euphaedra castanoides Hecq, 1985
Euphaedra edwardsii (van der Hoeven, 1845)
Euphaedra ruspina (Hewitson, 1865)
Euphaedra harpalyce spatiosa (Mabille, 1876)
Euphaedra harpalyce serena Talbot, 1928
Euphaedra luafa Oremans, 1998 (endemic)
Euphaedra losinga losinga (Hewitson, 1864)
Euphaedra losinga wardi (Druce, 1874)
Euphaedra losinga limita Hecq, 1978
Euphaedra cuypersiana Hecq, 2006 (endemic)
Euphaedra castanea Berger, 1981 (endemic)
Euphaedra sardetta Berger, 1981
Euphaedra wissmanni Niepelt, 1906 (endemic)
Euptera amieti Collins & Libert, 1998
Euptera choveti Amiet & Collins, 1998
Euptera crowleyi centralis Libert, 1995
Euptera debruynei (Hecq, 1990) (endemic)
Euptera ducarmei Collins, 1998
Euptera elabontas mweruensis Neave, 1910
Euptera falsathyma Schultze, 1916
Euptera freyja ornata Libert, 1998
Euptera ginettae Libert, 2005 (endemic)
Euptera hirundo hirundo Staudinger, 1891
Euptera hirundo lufirensis Joicey & Talbot, 1921
Euptera ituriensis Libert, 1998 (endemic)
Euptera liberti Collins, 1987
Euptera mirabilis Libert, 2005 (endemic)
Euptera mirifica Carpenter & Jackson, 1950
Euptera neptunus Joicey & Talbot, 1924
Euptera pluto pluto (Ward, 1873)
Euptera pluto primitiva Hancock, 1984
Euptera schultzei Libert & Chovet, 1998
Euptera semirufa Joicey & Talbot, 1921
Pseudathyma callina (Grose-Smith, 1898)
Pseudathyma cyrili Chovet, 2002
Pseudathyma endjami Libert, 2002
Pseudathyma jacksoni kivuensis Libert, 2002
Pseudathyma michelae Libert, 2002
Pseudathyma neptidina Karsch, 1894
Pseudathyma plutonica plutonica Butler, 1902
Pseudathyma plutonica shaba Chovet, 2002

Heliconiinae

Acraeini
Acraea cerasa cerita Sharpe, 1906
Acraea kraka pallida Carpenter, 1932
Acraea acara Hewitson, 1865
Acraea admatha Hewitson, 1865
Acraea anemosa Hewitson, 1865
Acraea eltringhami Joicey & Talbot, 1921
Acraea endoscota Le Doux, 1928
Acraea eugenia Karsch, 1893
Acraea hamata Joicey & Talbot, 1922
Acraea insignis Distant, 1880
Acraea kinduana Pierre, 1979 (endemic)
Acraea leucographa Ribbe, 1889
Acraea neobule Doubleday, 1847
Acraea pseudolycia Butler, 1874
Acraea quirina (Fabricius, 1781)
Acraea zetes (Linnaeus, 1758)
Acraea acrita Hewitson, 1865
Acraea annonae Pierre, 1987 (endemic)
Acraea atolmis Westwood, 1881
Acraea bailundensis Wichgraf, 1918
Acraea cepheus (Linnaeus, 1758)
Acraea chaeribula Oberthür, 1893
Acraea diogenes Suffert, 1904
Acraea egina (Cramer, 1775)
Acraea eltringhamiana Le Doux, 1932
Acraea guillemei Oberthür, 1893
Acraea loranae Pierre, 1987 (endemic)
Acraea lualabae Neave, 1910 (endemic)
Acraea mansya Eltringham, 1911
Acraea omrora umbraetae Pierre, 1988
Acraea overlaeti Pierre, 1988 (endemic)
Acraea periphanes Oberthür, 1893
Acraea asboloplintha Karsch, 1894
Acraea atergatis Westwood, 1881
Acraea buettneri Rogenhofer, 1890
Acraea caecilia (Fabricius, 1781)
Acraea caldarena Hewitson, 1877
Acraea intermediodes Ackery, 1995
Acraea leucopyga Aurivillius, 1904
Acraea natalica Boisduval, 1847
Acraea oncaea Hopffer, 1855
Acraea pseudegina Westwood, 1852
Acraea rhodesiana Wichgraf, 1909
Acraea rogersi Hewitson, 1873
Acraea sykesi Sharpe, 1902
Acraea adrasta pancalis (Jordan, 1910)
Acraea aganice nicega (Suffert, 1904)
Acraea alcinoe camerunica (Aurivillius, 1893)
Acraea consanguinea intermedia (Aurivillius, 1899)
Acraea elongata (Butler, 1874)
Acraea epaea epaea (Cramer, 1779)
Acraea epaea bicolorata (Le Doux, 1937)
Acraea epaea kivuana (Jordan, 1910)
Acraea epaea lutosa (Suffert, 1904)
Acraea epiprotea (Butler, 1874)
Acraea excisa (Butler, 1874)
Acraea formosa (Butler, 1874)
Acraea leopoldina leopoldina (Aurivillius, 1895)
Acraea leopoldina brevimacula (Talbot, 1928)
Acraea leopoldina macrosticha (Bethune-Baker, 1908)
Acraea macarista (Sharpe, 1906)
Acraea obliqua kivuensis (Joicey & Talbot, 1927)
Acraea persanguinea (Rebel, 1914)
Acraea poggei poggei Dewitz, 1879
Acraea poggei nelsoni Grose-Smith & Kirby, 1892
Acraea pseuderyta Godman & Salvin, 1890
Acraea quadricolor latifasciata (Sharpe, 1892)
Acraea tellus tellus (Aurivillius, 1893)
Acraea tellus schubotzi (Grünberg, 1911)
Acraea umbra hemileuca (Jordan, 1914)
Acraea umbra macarioides (Aurivillius, 1893)
Acraea vestalis congoensis (Le Doux, 1937)
Acraea vestalis stavelia (Suffert, 1904)
Acraea acerata Hewitson, 1874
Acraea alciope Hewitson, 1852
Acraea alciopoides Joicey & Talbot, 1921
Acraea alicia (Sharpe, 1890)
Acraea althoffi althoffi Dewitz, 1889
Acraea althoffi rubrofasciata Aurivillius, 1895
Acraea amicitiae Heron, 1909
Acraea ansorgei Grose-Smith, 1898
Acraea aurivillii Staudinger, 1896
Acraea bonasia (Fabricius, 1775)
Acraea buschbecki Dewitz, 1889
Acraea burgessi Jackson, 1956
Acraea cabira Hopffer, 1855
Acraea circeis (Drury, 1782)
Acraea disjuncta kigeziensis Jackson, 1956
Acraea encedana Pierre, 1976
Acraea encoda Pierre, 1981
Acraea serena (Fabricius, 1775)
Acraea esebria Hewitson, 1861
Acraea goetzei Thurau, 1903
Acraea grosvenori Eltringham, 1912
Acraea hecqui Berger, 1981 (endemic)
Acraea iturina Grose-Smith, 1890
Acraea jodutta (Fabricius, 1793)
Acraea toruna Grose-Smith, 1900
Acraea kalinzu Carpenter, 1936
Acraea lumiri Bethune-Baker, 1908
Acraea lycoa Godart, 1819
Acraea oberthueri Butler, 1895
Acraea orestia Hewitson, 1874
Acraea pelopeia Staudinger, 1896
Acraea peneleos pelasgius Grose-Smith, 1900
Acraea pentapolis Ward, 1871
Acraea pharsalus Ward, 1871
Acraea pierrei Berger, 1981 (endemic)
Acraea rangatana bettiana Joicey & Talbot, 1921
Acraea rileyi Le Doux, 1931 (endemic)
Acraea sotikensis Sharpe, 1892
Acraea uvui Grose-Smith, 1890
Acraea ventura ventura Hewitson, 1877
Acraea ventura ochrascens Sharpe, 1902
Acraea vesperalis Grose-Smith, 1890
Acraea viviana Staudinger, 1896
Acraea anacreontica Grose-Smith, 1898
Acraea lusinga Overlaet, 1955
Acraea mirifica Lathy, 1906
Acraea rahira Boisduval, 1833
Acraea wigginsi Neave, 1904
Acraea cinerea cinerea Neave, 1904
Acraea cinerea luluae Berger, 1981
Acraea ntebiae ntebiae Sharpe, 1897
Acraea ntebiae dewitzi Carcasson, 1981
Acraea oreas oreas Sharpe, 1891
Acraea oreas angolanus Lathy, 1906
Acraea orinata Oberthür, 1893
Acraea parrhasia servona Godart, 1819
Acraea penelope Staudinger, 1896
Acraea perenna Doubleday, 1847
Acraea quirinalis Grose-Smith, 1900
Acraea semivitrea Aurivillius, 1895
Acraea kuekenthali Le Doux, 1922

Argynnini
Issoria baumanni excelsior (Butler, 1896)
Issoria baumanni katangae (Neave, 1910)

Vagrantini
Lachnoptera anticlia (Hübner, 1819)
Phalanta eurytis (Doubleday, 1847)
Phalanta phalantha aethiopica (Rothschild & Jordan, 1903)

Hesperiidae

Coeliadinae
Coeliades bixana Evans, 1940
Coeliades forestan (Stoll, [1782])
Coeliades hanno (Plötz, 1879)
Coeliades libeon (Druce, 1875)
Coeliades pisistratus (Fabricius, 1793)
Pyrrhochalcia iphis dejongi Collins & Larsen, 2008

Pyrginae

Celaenorrhinini
Loxolexis hollandi (Druce, 1909)
Loxolexis holocausta (Mabille, 1891)
Celaenorrhinus beni jacquelinae Miller, 1971
Celaenorrhinus bettoni Butler, 1902
Celaenorrhinus boadicea boadicea (Hewitson, 1877)
Celaenorrhinus boadicea howarthi Berger, 1976
Celaenorrhinus chrysoglossa (Mabille, 1891)
Celaenorrhinus hecqui Berger, 1976 (endemic)
Celaenorrhinus homeyeri (Plötz, 1880)
Celaenorrhinus illustris (Mabille, 1891)
Celaenorrhinus intermixtus intermixtus Aurivillius, 1896
Celaenorrhinus intermixtus evansi Berger, 1975
Celaenorrhinus kasai kasai Evans, 1956 (endemic)
Celaenorrhinus kasai kapangana Berger, 1976 (endemic)
Celaenorrhinus kivuensis Joicey & Talbot, 1921
Celaenorrhinus macrostictus Holland, 1893
Celaenorrhinus meditrina (Hewitson, 1877)
Celaenorrhinus nigropunctata Bethune-Baker, 1908
Celaenorrhinus ovalis Evans, 1937
Celaenorrhinus perlustris perlustris Rebel, 1914
Celaenorrhinus perlustris katangensis Berger, 1976
Celaenorrhinus plagiatus Berger, 1976
Celaenorrhinus pooanus Aurivillius, 1910
Celaenorrhinus rutilans (Mabille, 1877)
Celaenorrhinus selysi Berger, 1955 (endemic)
Celaenorrhinus suzannae Berger, 1976 (endemic)
Eretis buamba Evans, 1937
Eretis camerona Evans, 1937
Eretis herewardi Riley, 1921
Eretis lugens (Rogenhofer, 1891)
Eretis melania Mabille, 1891
Eretis vaga Evans, 1937
Sarangesa astrigera Butler, 1894
Sarangesa brigida sanaga Miller, 1964
Sarangesa haplopa Swinhoe, 1907
Sarangesa lucidella (Mabille, 1891)
Sarangesa lunula Druce, 1910 (endemic)
Sarangesa maculata (Mabille, 1891)
Sarangesa maxima Neave, 1910
Sarangesa pandaensis Joicey & Talbot, 1921
Sarangesa seineri Strand, 1909
Sarangesa tertullianus (Fabricius, 1793)
Sarangesa thecla thecla (Plötz, 1879)
Sarangesa thecla mabira Evans, 1956
Sarangesa tricerata (Mabille, 1891)

Tagiadini
Eagris decastigma purpura Evans, 1937
Eagris lucetia (Hewitson, 1875)
Eagris tetrastigma (Mabille, 1891)
Eagris tigris Evans, 1937
Calleagris hollandi (Butler, 1897)
Calleagris jamesoni (Sharpe, 1890)
Calleagris lacteus (Mabille, 1877)
Calleagris landbecki (Druce, 1910)
Procampta rara Holland, 1892
Caprona adelica Karsch, 1892
Netrobalane canopus (Trimen, 1864)
Abantis bamptoni Collins & Larsen, 1994
Abantis bismarcki Karsch, 1892
Abantis contigua Evans, 1937
Abantis efulensis Holland, 1896
Abantis leucogaster leucogaster (Mabille, 1890)
Abantis leucogaster iruma Evans, 1951
Abantis lucretia lofu Neave, 1910
Abantis paradisea (Butler, 1870)
Abantis rubra Holland, 1920
Abantis tettensis Hopffer, 1855
Abantis venosa Trimen & Bowker, 1889
Abantis vidua Weymer, 1901
Abantis zambesiaca (Westwood, 1874)

Carcharodini
Spialia depauperata (Strand, 1911)
Spialia dromus (Plötz, 1884)
Spialia mafa (Trimen, 1870)
Spialia ploetzi (Aurivillius, 1891)
Spialia secessus (Trimen, 1891)

Hesperiinae

Aeromachini
Astictopterus abjecta (Snellen, 1872)
Astictopterus punctulata (Butler, 1895)
Ampittia capenas blanda Evans, 1947
Kedestes brunneostriga (Plötz, 1884)
Kedestes lema Neave, 1910
Kedestes mohozutza (Wallengren, 1857)
Kedestes protensa Butler, 1901
Kedestes straeleni Evans, 1956
Gorgyra aretina (Hewitson, 1878)
Gorgyra bibulus Riley, 1929
Gorgyra bina Evans, 1937
Gorgyra diversata Evans, 1937
Gorgyra johnstoni (Butler, 1894)
Gorgyra kalinzu Evans, 1949
Gorgyra minima Holland, 1896
Gorgyra mocquerysii Holland, 1896
Gorgyra pali Evans, 1937
Gorgyra rubescens Holland, 1896
Gorgyra sara Evans, 1937
Gorgyra sola Evans, 1937
Gyrogra subnotata (Holland, 1894)
Teniorhinus harona (Westwood, 1881)
Teniorhinus ignita (Mabille, 1877)
Teniorhinus niger (Druce, 1910)
Ceratrichia argyrosticta enta Evans, 1947
Ceratrichia aurea Druce, 1910
Ceratrichia brunnea Bethune-Baker, 1906
Ceratrichia clara medea Evans, 1937
Ceratrichia flandria Evans, 1956 (endemic)
Ceratrichia hollandi Bethune-Baker, 1908
Ceratrichia mabirensis Riley, 1925
Ceratrichia semilutea Mabille, 1891
Ceratrichia semlikensis Joicey & Talbot, 1921
Ceratrichia wollastoni Heron, 1909
Pardaleodes bule Holland, 1896
Pardaleodes edipus (Stoll, 1781)
Pardaleodes fan (Holland, 1894)
Pardaleodes incerta (Snellen, 1872)
Pardaleodes sator pusiella Mabille, 1877
Pardaleodes tibullus (Fabricius, 1793)
Xanthodisca astrape (Holland, 1892)
Xanthodisca vibius (Hewitson, 1878)
Acada annulifer (Holland, 1892)
Acada biseriata (Mabille, 1893)
Rhabdomantis galatia (Hewitson, 1868)
Rhabdomantis sosia (Mabille, 1891)
Osmodes adon (Mabille, 1890)
Osmodes adonia Evans, 1937
Osmodes adosus (Mabille, 1890)
Osmodes costatus Aurivillius, 1896
Osmodes distincta Holland, 1896
Osmodes hollandi Evans, 1937
Osmodes laronia (Hewitson, 1868)
Osmodes lux Holland, 1892
Osmodes omar Swinhoe, 1916
Osmodes thora (Plötz, 1884)
Parosmodes lentiginosa (Holland, 1896)
Parosmodes morantii (Trimen, 1873)
Paracleros biguttulus (Mabille, 1890)
Paracleros substrigata (Holland, 1893)
Osphantes ogowena ogowena (Mabille, 1891)
Osphantes ogowena lulua Evans, 1956
Acleros bibundica Strand, 1913
Acleros mackenii olaus (Plötz, 1884)
Acleros mackenii instabilis Mabille, 1890
Acleros neavei Evans, 1937
Acleros nigrapex Strand, 1913
Acleros ploetzi Mabille, 1890
Acleros sparsum Druce, 1909
Semalea arela (Mabille, 1891)
Semalea atrio (Mabille, 1891)
Semalea pulvina (Plötz, 1879)
Semalea sextilis (Plötz, 1886)
Hypoleucis ophiusa ophiusa (Hewitson, 1866)
Hypoleucis ophiusa ophir Evans, 1937
Hypoleucis sophia Evans, 1937
Hypoleucis tripunctata draga Evans, 1937
Meza banda (Evans, 1937)
Meza cybeutes (Holland, 1894)
Meza indusiata (Mabille, 1891)
Meza larea (Neave, 1910)
Meza mabea (Holland, 1894)
Meza meza (Hewitson, 1877)
Paronymus budonga (Evans, 1938)
Paronymus nevea (Druce, 1910)
Paronymus xanthias (Mabille, 1891)
Andronymus caesar caesar (Fabricius, 1793)
Andronymus caesar philander (Hopffer, 1855)
Andronymus evander (Mabille, 1890)
Andronymus fenestrella Bethune-Baker, 1908
Andronymus fontainei T.B. Larsen & Congdon, 2012
Andronymus gander Evans, 1947
Andronymus helles Evans, 1937
Andronymus hero Evans, 1937
Andronymus marcus Usher, 1980
Andronymus neander (Plötz, 1884)
Chondrolepis cynthia Evans, 1936
Chondrolepis ducarmei T.B. Larsen & Congdon, 2012
Chondrolepis leggei (Heron, 1909)
Chondrolepis niveicornis (Plötz, 1883)
Zophopetes cerymica (Hewitson, 1867)
Zophopetes nobilior (Holland, 1896)
Gamia buchholzi (Plötz, 1879)
Artitropa comus (Stoll, 1782)
Artitropa milleri Riley, 1925
Artitropa reducta Aurivillius, 1925
Mopala orma (Plötz, 1879)
Gretna balenge (Holland, 1891)
Gretna carmen Evans, 1937
Gretna cylinda (Hewitson, 1876)
Gretna lacida (Hewitson, 1876)
Gretna waga (Plötz, 1886)
Pteroteinon caenira (Hewitson, 1867)
Pteroteinon capronnieri (Plötz, 1879)
Pteroteinon ceucaenira (Druce, 1910)
Pteroteinon concaenira Belcastro & Larsen, 1996
Pteroteinon iricolor (Holland, 1890)
Pteroteinon laterculus (Holland, 1890)
Pteroteinon laufella (Hewitson, 1868)
Pteroteinon pruna Evans, 1937
Leona binoevatus (Mabille, 1891)
Leona maracanda (Hewitson, 1876)
Leona lota Evans, 1937
Leona leonora leonora (Plötz, 1879)
Leona leonora dux Evans, 1937
Leona stoehri (Karsch, 1893)
Leona meloui (Riley, 1926)
Leona halma Evans, 1937
Leona luehderi luehderi (Plötz, 1879)
Leona luehderi laura Evans, 1937
Leona allyni (Miller, 1971) (endemic)
Caenides kangvensis Holland, 1896
Caenides xychus (Mabille, 1891)
Caenides benga (Holland, 1891)
Caenides dacela (Hewitson, 1876)
Caenides hidaroides Aurivillius, 1896
Caenides dacena (Hewitson, 1876)
Monza alberti (Holland, 1896)
Monza cretacea (Snellen, 1872)
Monza punctata punctata (Aurivillius, 1910)
Monza punctata crola Evans, 1937
Melphina evansi Berger, 1974 (endemic)
Melphina flavina Lindsey & Miller, 1965
Melphina hulstaerti Berger, 1974 (endemic)
Melphina malthina (Hewitson, 1876)
Melphina unistriga (Holland, 1893)
Fresna carlo Evans, 1937
Fresna cojo (Karsch, 1893)
Fresna netopha (Hewitson, 1878)
Platylesches batangae (Holland, 1894)
Platylesches galesa (Hewitson, 1877)
Platylesches lamba Neave, 1910
Platylesches langa Evans, 1937
Platylesches panga Evans, 1937
Platylesches picanini (Holland, 1894)
Platylesches robustus Neave, 1910
Platylesches shona Evans, 1937
Platylesches hassani Collins & Larsen, 2008

Baorini
Brusa allardi Berger, 1967
Brusa saxicola (Neave, 1910)
Zenonia anax Evans, 1937
Zenonia crasta Evans, 1937
Borbo binga (Evans, 1937)
Borbo fanta (Evans, 1937)
Borbo lugens (Hopffer, 1855)
Borbo perobscura (Druce, 1912)
Borbo sirena (Evans, 1937)
Parnara monasi (Trimen & Bowker, 1889)

Heteropterinae
Metisella abdeli (Krüger, 1928)
Metisella alticola (Aurivillius, 1925)
Metisella angolana cooksoni (Druce, 1905)
Metisella formosus linda Evans, 1937
Metisella formosus nyanza Evans, 1937
Metisella kambove (Neave, 1910)
Metisella medea Evans, 1937
Metisella midas (Butler, 1894)
Metisella willemi (Wallengren, 1857)
Tsitana wallacei (Neave, 1910)
Lepella lepeletier (Latreille, 1824)

See also
List of moths of the Democratic Republic of the Congo
Wildlife of the Democratic Republic of the Congo
Royal Museum for Central Africa - location of many type specimens
List of ecoregions in the Democratic Republic of the Congo

References

Mabille, 1877 Catalogue des Lépidoptères du Congo. [1] Bull. Soc. zool. Fr. 2 (3) : 214-240

External links
Seitz, A. Die Gross-Schmetterlinge der Erde 13: Die Afrikanischen Tagfalter. Plates
Seitz, A. Die Gross-Schmetterlinge der Erde 13: Die Afrikanischen Tagfalter. Text 
Mark C. Williams Afrotropical Butterflies digital edition "Please note that a .pdf version of all our articles is available free of charge to all users who are registered and logged in on the site''. 

Democratic Republic of the Congo
Democratic Republic of the Congo
Butterflies
 Butterflies
Butterflies of Africa